= Timeline of Kraków =

The following is a timeline of the history of the city of Kraków, Poland.

== Prior to 16th century ==
- 1000 - Catholic diocese of Kraków established.
- 1038 - Capital of Poland relocated from Gniezno/Poznań to Kraków.
- 1044 - Benedictine Abbey of Tyniec established in Tyniec near Kraków.
- 1079 - Capital of Poland relocated from Kraków to Płock.
- 1138
  - Capital of Poland relocated from Płock back to Kraków.
  - Kraków becomes the capital of the newly formed Seniorate Province.
- 1142 - Cathedral built (approximate date).
- 1241 - Kraków sacked by Mongol forces during the first Mongol invasion of Poland.
- 1257 - The town granted Magdeburg rights, signing of Lokacja Krakowa.
- 1290 - Town captured by Wenceslaus II of Bohemia.
- 1306 - Kraków taken by Władysław Łokietek.
- 1313 - Kraków Town Hall built (approximate date).
- 1315 - 27 June: Polish-Danish-Norwegian-Swedish alliance concluded in Kraków.
- 1320
  - 20 January: Coronation of Władysław I Łokietek as King of Poland in the Wawel Cathedral, as the first Polish king to be crowned in Kraków.
  - Kraków becomes the official coronation site for the kings of Poland.
- 1333
  - Burial of Władysław I Łokietek in the Wawel Cathedral as the first Polish king to be buried there.
  - Wawel Cathedral becomes the official burial site for the kings of Poland.
- 1364
  - 12 May: Kraków Academy founded.
  - 22–27 September: Congress of Kraków.
  - Wawel Cathedral and Collegium Maius built.
- 1384 - 16 October: Royal coronation of Queen Jadwiga of Poland in the Wawel Cathedral.
- 1386
  - 15 February: Baptism of Władysław II Jagiełło in the Wawel Cathedral.
  - 18 February: Royal wedding of Władysław II Jagiełło and Jadwiga of Poland.
  - 4 March: Royal coronation of Władysław II Jagiełło in the Wawel Cathedral.
- 1390 - Public clock installed (approximate date).
- 1395 - Kraków Cloth Hall built.
- 1397 - St. Mary's Basilica built.
- 1399 - Burial of Queen Jadwiga of Poland and Princess Elizabeth Bonifacia in the Wawel Cathedral.
- 1407 - Synagogue built in Kazimierz.
- 1417 - Royal coronation of Elizabeth Granowska as Queen consort of Poland in the Wawel Cathedral.
- 1420 - Bellmakers guild established.
- 1443 - Earthquake, which caused damage to the Saint Catherine Church.
- 1491
  - Paper mill established in Prądnik Czerwony.
  - Printing press in operation.
  - Nicolaus Copernicus begins studies in Kraków.

== 16th to 18th centuries ==
- 1521 - Sigismund Bell installed in tower of Wawel Cathedral.
- 1525
  - 8 April: Treaty of Kraków signed.
  - 10 April: Prussian Homage.
- 1558 - Establishment of a permanent postal connection between Kraków and Venice; foundation of Poczta Polska. The organizer was the Italian Prospero Provana, and from 1569 the royal privilege was transferred to Valerian Montelupi.
- 1566 - Kraków arsenal built (near St. Florian's Gate).

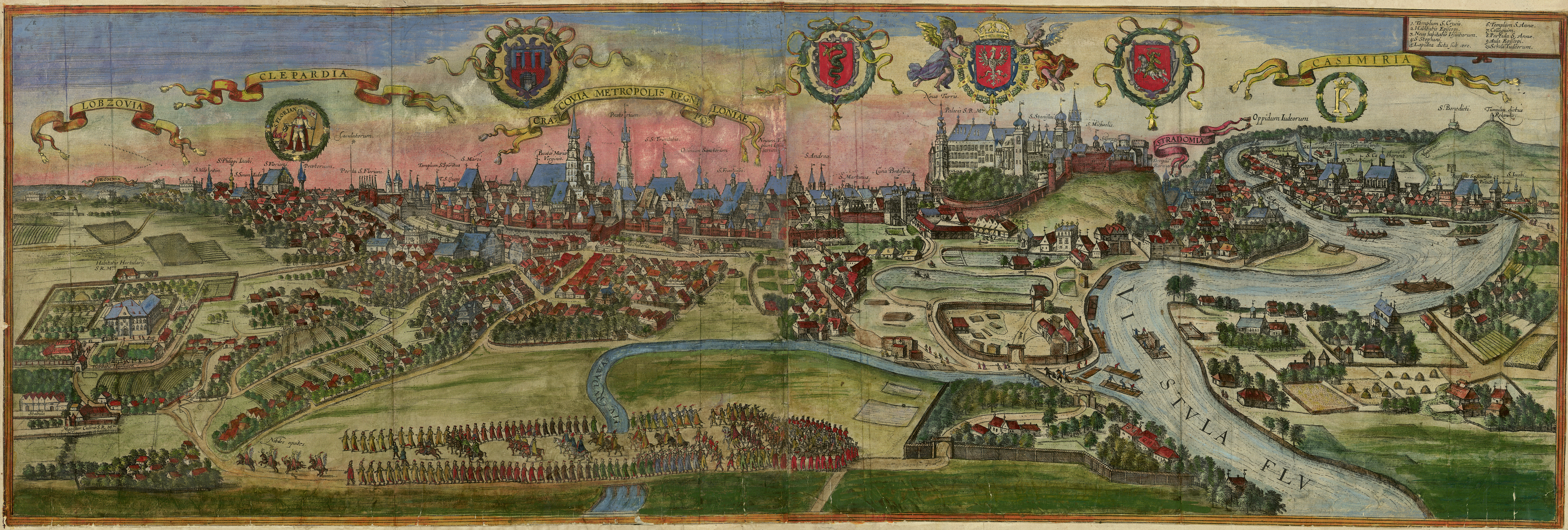
Kraków in the early 17th century

- 1587 - Kraków besieged by Maximilian III, Archduke of Austria.
- 1596 - First acquisition of citizenship in the city by a Scot (see also Scots in Poland).
- 1609 - Polish capital relocated from Kraków to Warsaw by Sigismund III Vasa (approximate date).
- 1610 - Bagel first mentioned.
- 1618 - Church of St. Adalbert rebuilt.
- 1619 - Saints Peter and Paul Church built.
- 1643 - Obergymnasium of St. Anna (school) built on St. Anna Street, Kraków.
- 1655 - Siege of Kraków (1655) by Swedish forces.

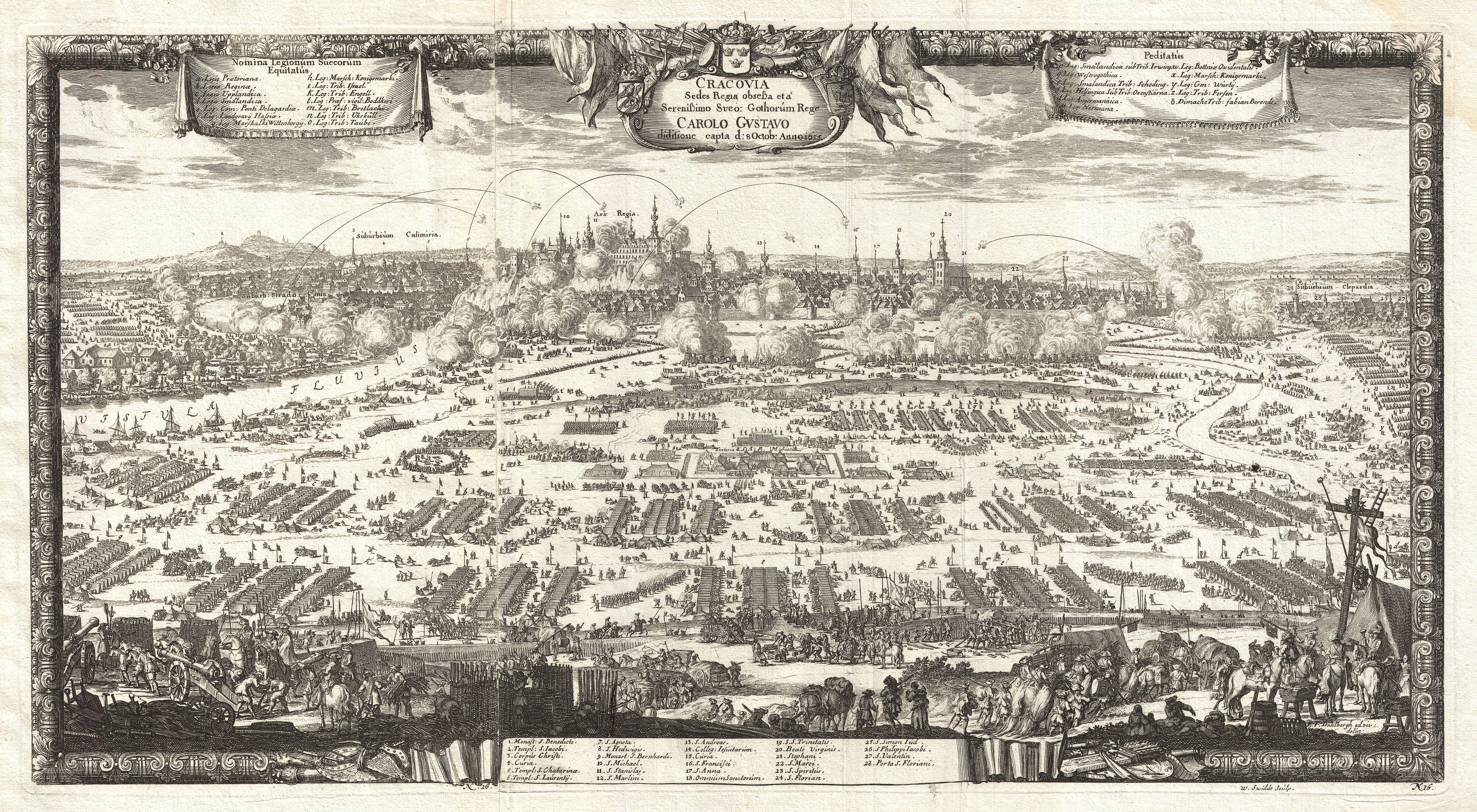
Siege of Kraków by Swedish forces, October 1655

- 1661 - Merkuriusz Polski Ordynaryjny newspaper begins publication.
- 1702 - Swedish invasion of Poland (1701–1706): City taken by forces of Charles XII of Sweden.
- 1703 - Church of St. Anne rebuilt.
- 1768
  - City taken by Russian forces.
  - St. Florian's Church rebuilt.
- 1775 - 2nd Infantry Regiment of the Polish Crown Army stationed in Kraków.
- 1781 - Theatre opens.
- 1783 - Botanic Garden of the Jagiellonian University founded.

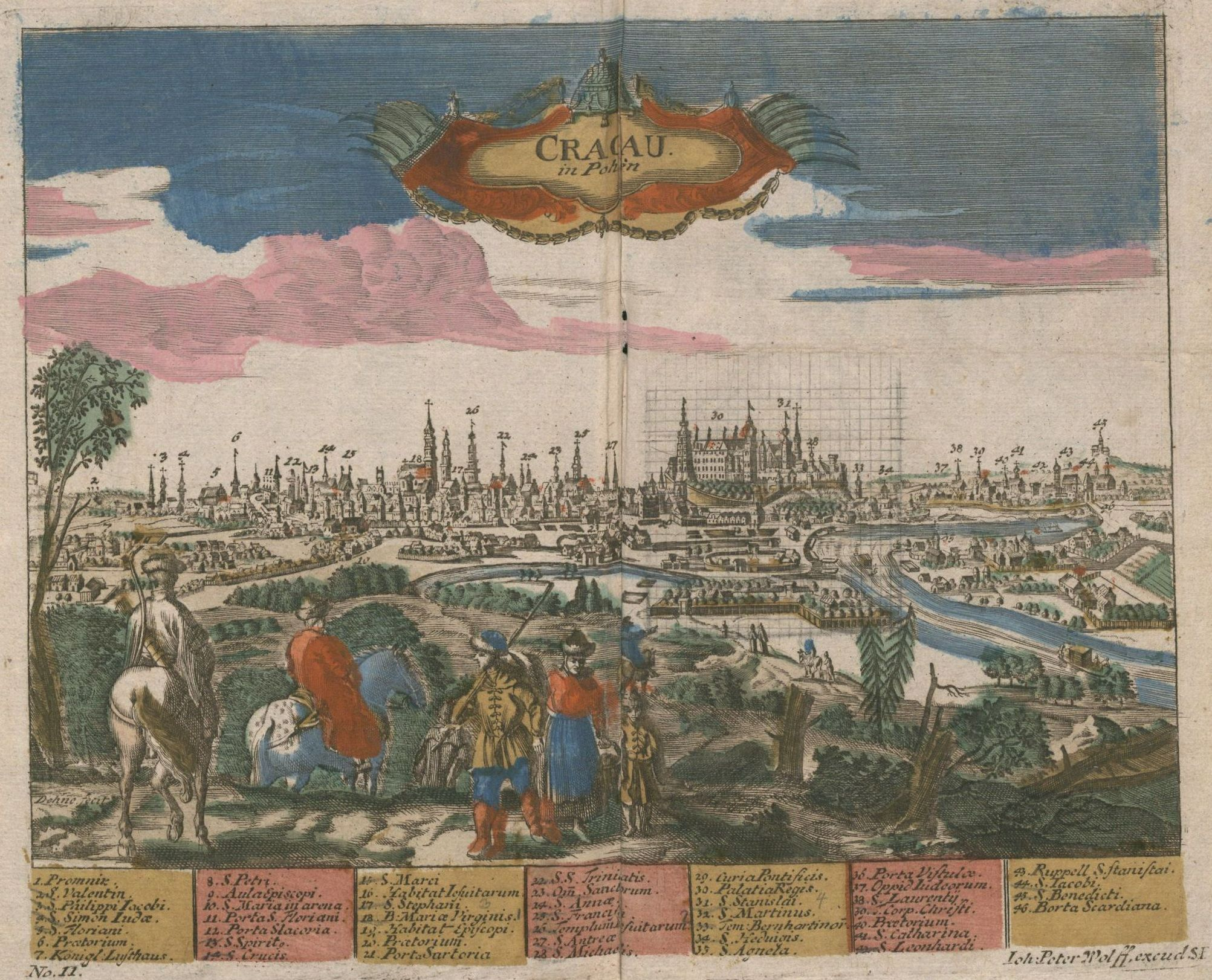
Kraków in the late 18th century

- 1794
  - 24 March: Kościuszko's proclamation against Russian rule occurs in Main Square.
  - Polish 3rd Infantry Regiment stationed in Kraków.
  - June: Prussians in power.
- 1795 - City annexed by Austria in the Third Partition of Poland.

== 19th century ==
- 1809 - City becomes part of the Duchy of Warsaw.
- 1810 - Population: 23,612.
- 1815 - Republic of Krakow established per Congress of Vienna.
- 1820 - Most of Kraków Town Hall demolished (except tower).
- 1823 - Kościuszko Mound completed.
- 1829 - Fryderyk Chopin visited Kraków.
- 1831 - City occupied by Russian forces.
- 1846
  - February: Kraków Uprising against Austrian forces; Polish National Government (Kraków Uprising) established.
  - November: City becomes part of Austria again; Grand Duchy of Kraków established.
- 1847 - Kraków Główny railway station built.
- 1848 - Czas newspaper begins publication.

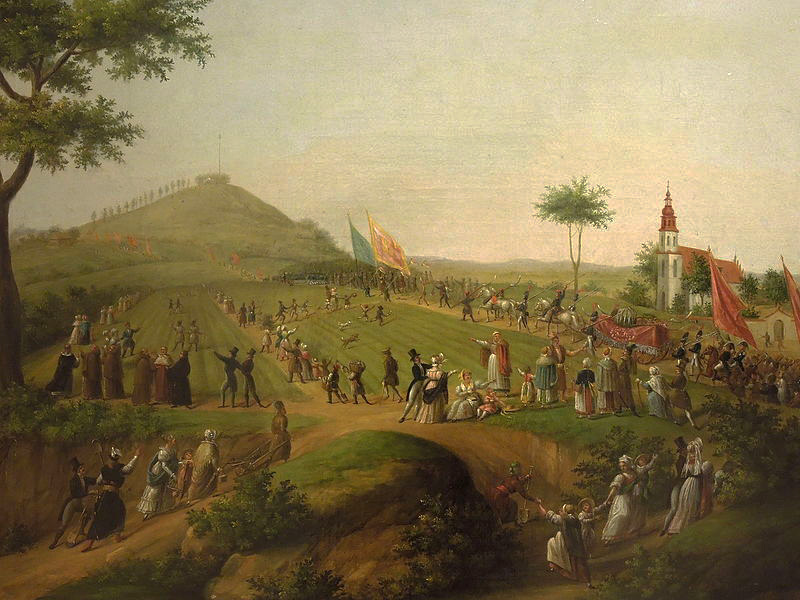
Building of the Kościuszko Mound (painting by Teodor Baltazar Stachowicz)

- 1850
  - 18 February: Archaeological Museum of Kraków established.
  - 18 July: Kraków fire of 1850.
- 1851 - Population: 41,086.
- 1869 - July: Imprisonment of nun Barbara Ubryk discovered; unrest ensues.
- 1873 - School of Fine Arts and Academy of Learning active.
- 1879 - National Museum, Kraków established.
- 1883:
  - The first ever liquefaction of oxygen and nitrogen performed by Zygmunt Wróblewski and Karol Olszewski in Kraków
  - Konstanty Schmidt-Ciążyński gifted his collection of engraved gems to National Museum in Kraków
- 1885 - Park Krakowski established.
- 1890 - Population: 76,025.
- 1893 - Municipal Theatre opens.
- 1898 - Mickiewicz monument installed in Main Square.
- 1900
  - Nicolaus Copernicus Monument unveiled.
  - Population: 91,310.

== 20th century ==
=== 1900–1939 ===
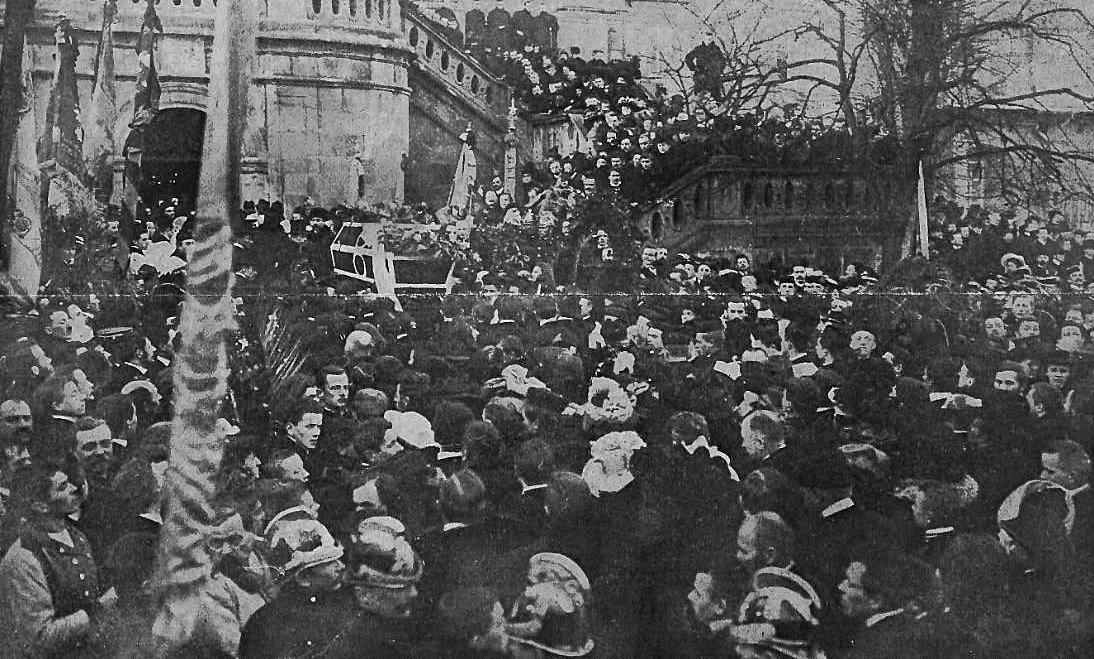
Funeral of Polish poet Stanisław Wyspiański in 1907

- 1904 - Emeryk Hutten-Czapski Museum opened.
- 1905 - Zielony Balonik literary cabaret begins in Jama Michalika on Floriańska Street.
- 1906 - Cracovia and Wisła Kraków football clubs founded.
- 1909 - Kraków Philharmonic Orchestra founded.
- 1910
  - 15 July: Grunwald Monument unveiled.
  - Population: 151,781.
- 1916 - Kino Sztuka (cinema) opens.
- 1917 - Formiści (art group) formed.
- 1918 - City becomes part of reborn Poland.
- 1919 - Wawel Kraków football club founded.
- 1920 - Population: 176,463.
- 1921
  - Garbarnia Kraków football club founded.
  - Cracovia wins its first Polish football championship.
- 1923 - Cracovia ice hockey team founded.
- 1927 - Wisła Kraków wins its first Polish football championship.
- 1929
  - Kraków Zoo opens.
  - Cracovia wins its first Polish men's basketball championship.
  - Cracovia wins its first Polish women's basketball championship.
- 1930 - Wawel Castle museum established.
- 1931
  - Kraków Philharmonic hall opens.
  - Garbarnia Kraków wins its first Polish football championship.
  - Population: 219,300.
- 1933
  - Grupa Krakowska (art group) formed.
  - Cracovia wins its first Polish men's volleyball championship.
- 1937 - Cracovia wins its first Polish ice hockey championship.

=== World War II (1939–1945) ===
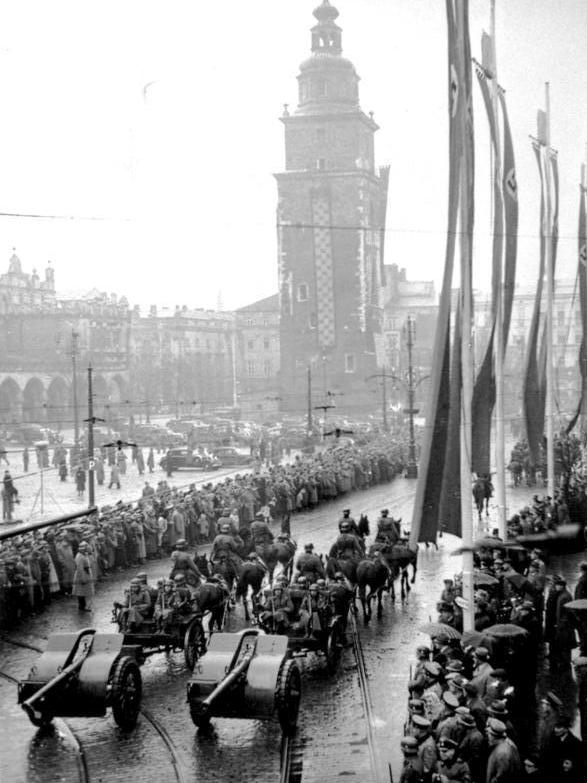
Parade of German police and SS in German-occupied Kraków in October 1940

- 1939
  - 6 September: German forces enter city.
  - 12 September: The Einsatzgruppe zbV entered the city.
  - 12 September: Execution of 10 Jews by the Germans.
  - September: Dulag transit camp for Polish prisoners of war established by the Germans.
  - September: Organizacja Orła Białego underground Polish resistance organization founded.
  - 4 November: City becomes seat of Nazi German General Government of occupied Poland.
  - 6 November: 183 Polish professors and lecturers arrested by the Germans during Sonderaktion Krakau.
  - 9–10 November: Mass arrests of 120 Poles, incl. teachers, students and judges, during the Intelligenzaktion.
- 1939–1940 - Massacres of over 1,700 Poles at Fort 49 of the Kraków Fortress and the adjacent forest.
- 1940
  - 30 March: Mass arrests of Poles during the AB-Aktion.
  - July: Dulag camp dissolved.
- 1941 - March: Kraków Ghetto of Jews established by occupying Germans.
- 1942
  - 15 April: Baudienst forced labour camp established by the Germans.
  - 5 June: Stalag 369 prisoner-of-war camp for Dutch, Belgian and French POWs established by the Germans.
  - Local branch of the Żegota underground Polish resistance organization established to rescue Jews from the Holocaust.
  - October: Kraków-Płaszów concentration camp established by the Germans.
- 1943 - March: Liquidation of the Kraków Ghetto.
- 1944
  - 22 July: Baudienst forced labour camp dissolved.
  - 6 August: Stalag 369 camp dissolved.
  - Deportations of Poles by the occupiers from the Dulag 121 camp in Pruszków to Kraków during and following the Warsaw Uprising.
- 1945
  - January: Kraków-Płaszów concentration camp evacuated by the occupiers and dissolved.
  - January: Russians take city; German occupation ends.

=== 1945–2000 ===
- 1945 – Historical Museum of Kraków established.
- 1946 - Krakow Polytechnic established.
- 1949
  - Gazeta Krakowska newspaper begins publication.
  - Development of Nowa Huta area begins.
- 1950
  - Bunkier Sztuki Contemporary Art Gallery founded.
  - Population: 347,500.

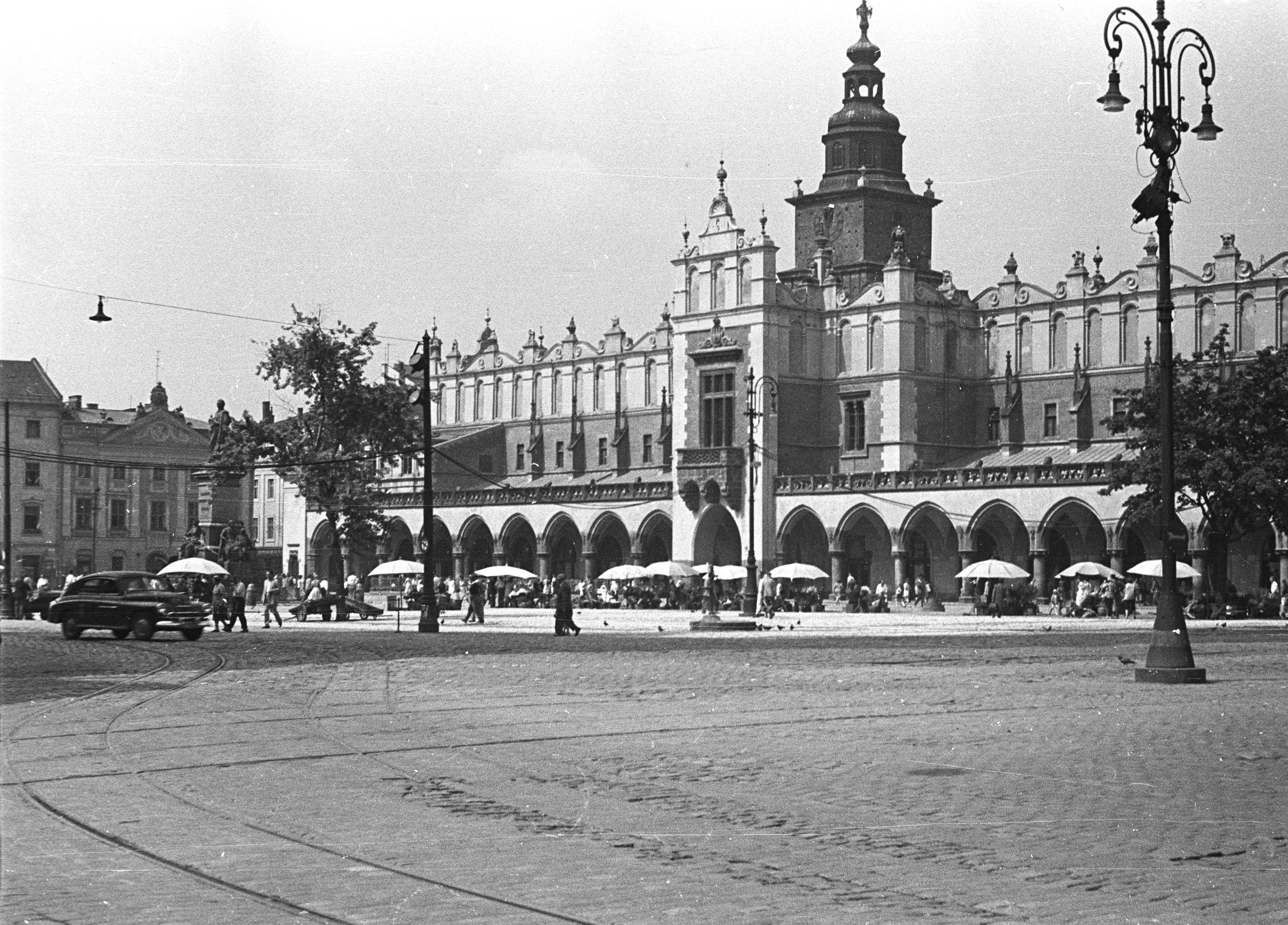
Kraków Old Town in 1958

- 1951 - Polish Academy of Sciences' Division of Medicinal Plants established.
- 1954
  - Lenin Steelworks begins operating.
  - Opera Krakowska founded.
  - Wisła Kraków wins its first Polish men's basketball championship.
- 1955
  - Cricot 2 theatre group formed.
  - Population: 428,231.
- 1956
  - 28 October: Start of mass blood donation for the Hungarian Revolution of 1956 (see also Hungary–Poland relations).
  - Raising of funds, food and medical supplies for the Hungarians.
  - 30 October, 5 November: Protests against the Soviet suppression of the Hungarian Revolution.
- 1959
  - Krzysztofory Gallery and Kino Mikro (cinema). open.
  - Wawel Kraków wins its first Polish women's basketball championship.
  - Wisła Kraków wins its first Polish women's volleyball championship.
- 1961 - Kraków Film Festival begins.
- 1963 - Wisła Kraków wins its first Polish women's basketball championship.
- 1964
  - Balice Airport begins operating.
  - Polish Aviation Museum established.
  - Karol Wojtyła becomes Catholic archbishop.
- 1965 – Population: 520,145.
- 1967 - Kino Kijów (cinema) opens.
- 1973 - Tyniec becomes part of Kraków.
- 1974 - Population: 662,900.

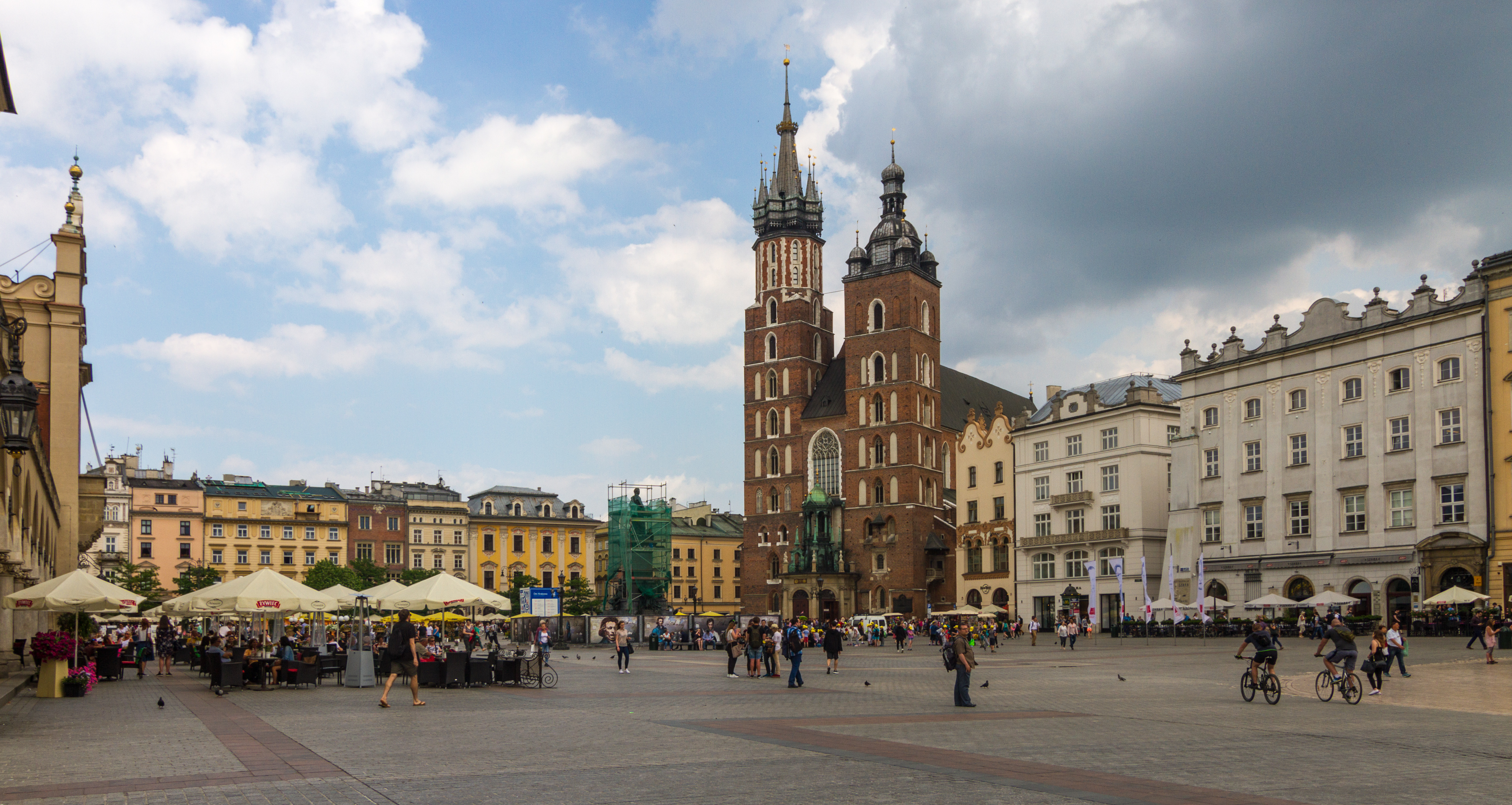
Kraków Old Town

- 1978
  - May: Kraków co-hosts the 1978 UEFA European Under-18 Championship.
  - Kraków Old Town designated an UNESCO World Heritage Site.
- 1979 - Hutnik Kraków wins its first Polish handball championship.
- 1988
  - Hutnik Kraków wins its first Polish men's volleyball championship.
  - Jewish Culture Festival in Kraków begins.
- 1990 - Czas Krakowski newspaper begins publication.
- 1993 - Institute for Strategic Studies established.
- 1997 - Cracow Klezmer Band formed.
- 1998 - Andrzej Maria Gołaś becomes mayor.
- 1999 - City becomes part of the Lesser Poland Voivodeship.
- 2000 - City designated a European Capital of Culture.

== 21st century ==
- 2001 - Honorary Consulate of Norway opened.
- 2002 - Jacek Majchrowski becomes mayor.
- 2004
  - 17 April: First khachkar in Poland unveiled.
  - 7 May: First Kraków Equality March.
- 2006 - Galeria Krakowska shopping mall in business.
- 2008
  - Kraków Fast Tram begins operating.
  - International Festival of Independent Cinema Off Plus Camera begins.
- 2009
  - Kino Agrafka (cinema) opens.
  - Sister city relationship established with San Francisco, USA.

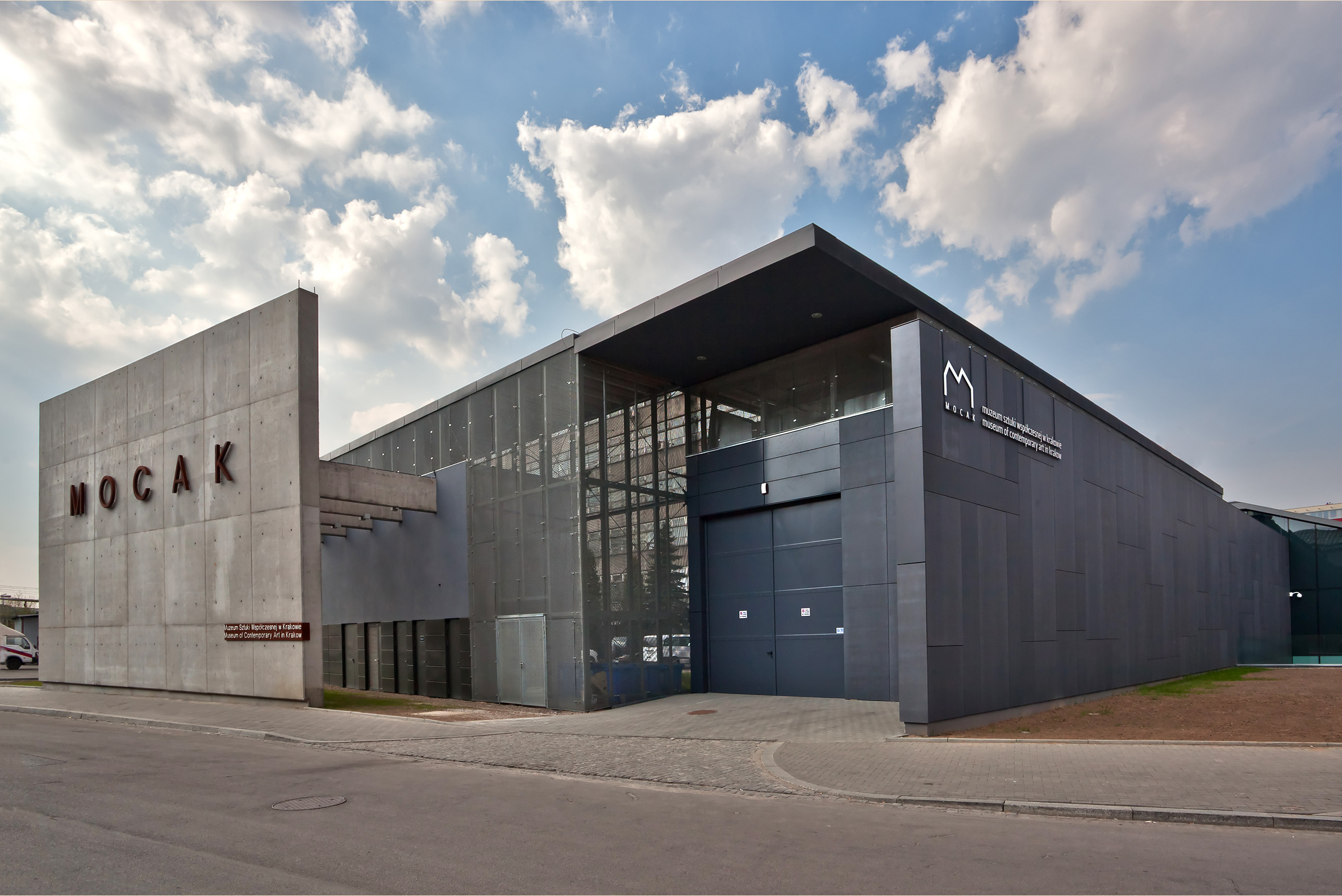
Museum of Contemporary Art in Kraków

- 2010
  - 1 February: Museum of Contemporary Art in Kraków opened.
  - 18 April: State funeral of Lech and Maria Kaczyński.
  - 10 June: Oskar Schindler's Enamel Factory museum opened.
  - 17 July: Ignacy Jan Paderewski monument erected in Strzelecki Park, Kraków.
  - 30 September: Bernatek Footbridge opened.
- 2012 - Population: 758,300.
- 2013
  - 8–9 October: Arraiolos Group meeting held.
  - Air pollution in Krakow reaches annual mean of 37 PM2.5 and 51 PM10, more than recommended.
- 2014
  - May: Tauron Arena opens.
  - May: Kraków referendum, 2014 held; Kraków bid for the 2022 Winter Olympics withdrawn.
- 2016
  - January: Kraków co-hosts the 2016 European Men's Handball Championship.
  - 13–17 July: Kraków hosts the final round of the 2016 FIVB Volleyball World League.
  - 26–31 July: Kraków hosts the World Youth Day 2016.
- 2017
  - June: Kraków co-hosts the 2017 UEFA European Under-21 Championship.
  - August–September: Kraków co-hosts the 2017 Men's European Volleyball Championship.
- 2021
  - June: Honorary Consulate of Peru opened.
  - September: Kraków co-hosts the 2021 Men's European Volleyball Championship.
- 2023
  - January: Kraków co-hosts the 2023 World Men's Handball Championship.
  - June–July: Kraków hosts the 2023 European Games.

== See also ==
- History of Kraków
- Other names of Kraków, e.g. Krakau
- List of mayors of Kraków
- List of churches of Kraków
- Synagogues of Kraków
- List of events in Kraków (currently ongoing)
- List of Polish monarchs, some crowned in Kraków

== Bibliography ==
Published in 18th-19th centuries

- William Coxe (1784), "Cracow", Travels into Poland, Russia, Sweden, and Denmark, London: T. Cadell, OCLC 654136
- Abraham Rees (1819), "Cracow", The Cyclopaedia, London: Longman, Hurst, Rees, Orme & Brown
- John Russell (1828), "Cracow", A Tour in Germany, and Some of the Southern Provinces of the Austrian Empire, in 1820, 1821, 1822, Edinburgh: Constable, OCLC 614379840
- David Brewster, ed. (1832). "Cracow". Edinburgh Encyclopædia. Vol. 7. Philadelphia: Joseph and Edward Parker. hdl:2027/mdp.39015068302770.
- Charles Knight, ed. (1866). "Cracow". Geography. English Cyclopaedia. Vol. 2. London: Bradbury, Evans, & Co. hdl:2027/nyp.33433000064794.
- William Henry Overall, ed. (1870). "Cracow". Dictionary of Chronology. London: William Tegg. hdl:2027/uc2.ark:/13960/t9m32q949.
- George Henry Townsend (1877), "Cracow", Manual of Dates (5th ed.), London: Frederick Warne & Co., hdl:2027/wu.89097349427
- David Kay (1880), "Principal Towns: Cracow", Austria-Hungary, Foreign Countries and British Colonies, London: Sampson Low, Marston, Searle, & Rivington, hdl:2027/mdp.39015030647005
- Józef Rostafiński (1891). Przewodnik po Krakowie i okolicy [Guide to Kraków] (in Polish). Kraków.
- Norddeutscher Lloyd (1896), "Cracow", Guide through Germany, Austria-Hungary, Italy, Switzerland, France, Belgium, Holland and England, Berlin: J. Reichmann & Cantor, OCLC 8395555

Published in 20th century

- "Cracow", Chambers's Encyclopaedia, London: W. & R. Chambers, 1901
- "Cracow". Handbook for Travellers in South Germany and Austria (15th ed.). London: J. Murray. 1903 – via Google Books.
- "Cracow". Catholic Encyclopedia. New York. 1908.
- "Cracow" . Encyclopædia Britannica. Vol. 7 (11th ed.). 1910. pp. 359–360.
- Benjamin Vincent (1910), "Cracow", Haydn's Dictionary of Dates (25th ed.), London: Ward, Lock & Co.
- "Cracow". Austria-Hungary (11th ed.). Leipzig: Karl Baedeker. 1911.
- Leonard Lepszy [in Polish] (1912), Cracow, the royal capital of ancient Poland, London: T.F. Unwin
- K.Z. Sowa (1984). "The development of Kraków in the nineteenth century against the background of the historic role of the city." (in) B. Hamm and B. Jaowiecki (eds.), Urbanism and human values. Bonn: BFLR, pp. 101–128.
- Trudy Ring, ed. (1995). "Kraków". International Dictionary of Historic Places: Northern Europe. Fitzroy Dearborn. p. 386. ISBN 978-1-136-63944-9.
- George Lerski (1996). "Cracow". Historical Dictionary of Poland, 966-1945. Greenwood. ISBN 978-0-313-26007-0.

Published in 21st century

- Howard Hughes; et al. (2003). "Significance of European 'Capital of Culture' for Tourism and Culture: The Case of Kraków 2000". International Journal of Arts Management. 5 (3): 12–23. JSTOR 41064794.
- Wardzyńska, Maria (2009). Był rok 1939. Operacja niemieckiej policji bezpieczeństwa w Polsce. Intelligenzaktion (in Polish). Warszawa: IPN.
- Laurențiu Rădvan [in Romanian] (2010), "Towns in the Kingdom of Poland: Wroclaw and Krakow", At Europe's Borders: Medieval Towns in the Romanian Principalities, Translated by Valentin Cîrdei, Leiden: Brill, p. 47+, ISBN 9789004180109
- Colum Hourihane, ed. (2012). "Krakow". Grove Encyclopedia of Medieval Art and Architecture. Oxford University Press. ISBN 978-0-19-539536-5.
