= Kino Mikro =

Studio cinema in Kraków, Poland

Coordinates: 50.0695°N 19.9238°E

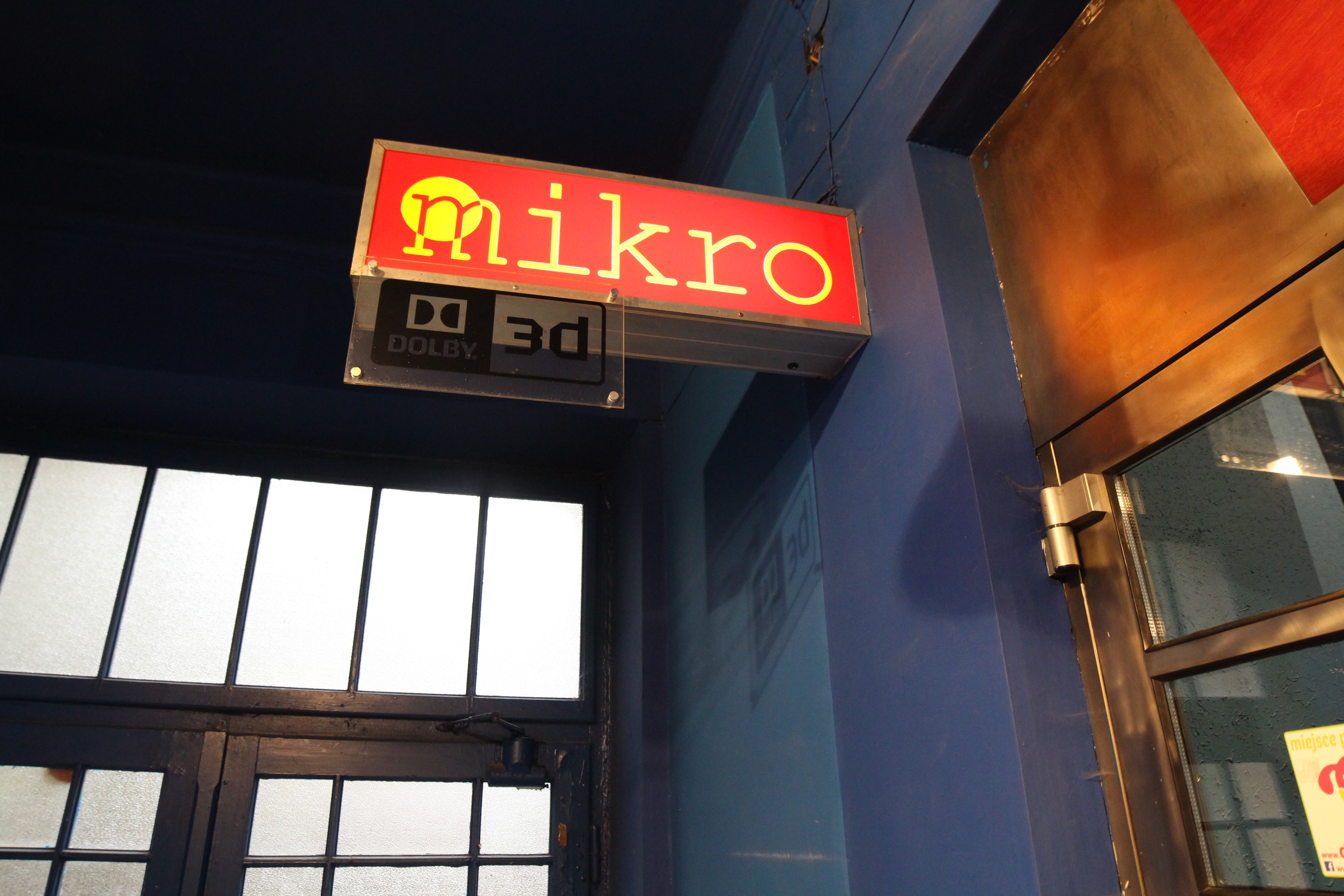
Kino Mikro, entrance

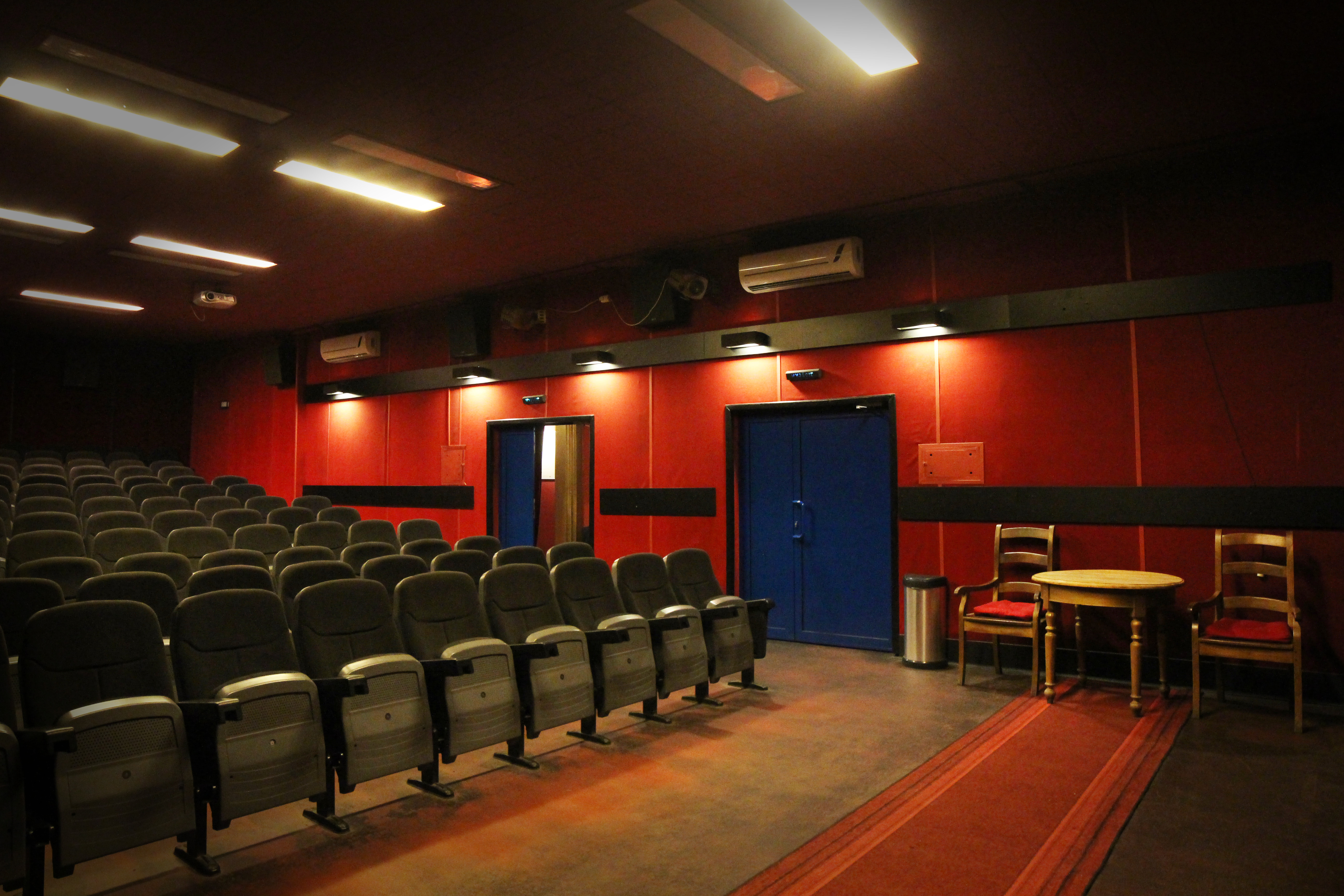
Large screening room (Mikro, 123 places)

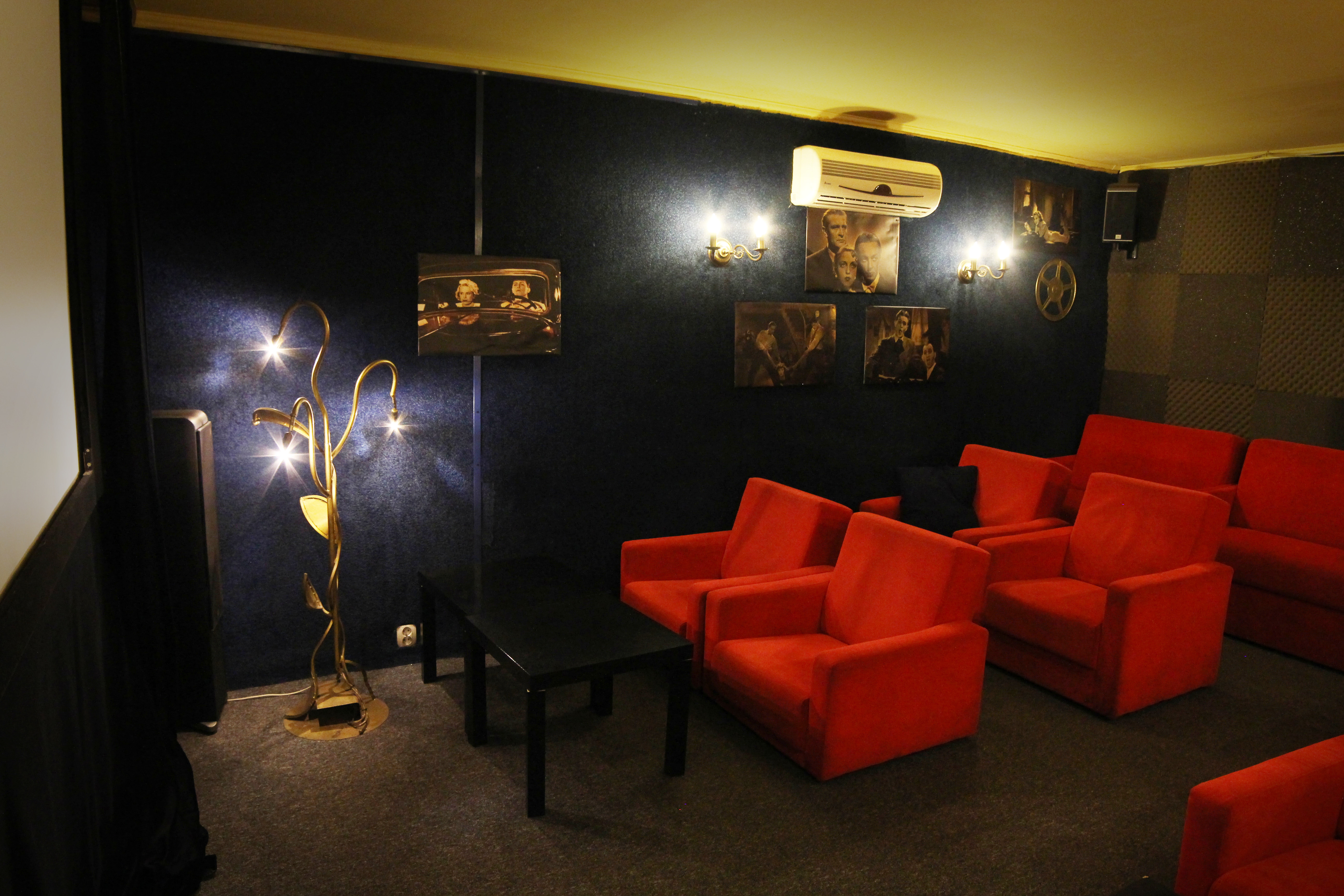
Small screening room (Mikroffala, 14 places)

Kino Mikro is a studio cinema in Kraków, Poland at Juliusza Lea Street 5. The cinema has been operating since 1959. Since 7 April 1984 it has operated as the Mikro&Mikroffala Film Club, part of Apollo Film Company.

== History ==
Kino Mikro operated at the then Feliks Dzierżyński Street (nowadays Juliusza Lea Street) in the 1950s as a police cinema. Roman Polanski, who was in his twenties, visited the screenings at the time.

On 7 April 1984 the Mikro&Mikroffala Film Club was inaugurated. The first director was Krzysztof Gierat. Since then Mikro became a venue for various film events: competitions, retrospectives and festivals, as well as other cultural undertakings. Several film directors attended the screenings of their films at Kino Mikro, among them Roman Polanski, Andrzej Wajda, Malcolm McDowell, Kazimierz Kutz, Jerzy Hoffman and Marcin Koszałka.

From February 2009 until early 2011, Mikro-Odeon Film Discussion Club was held at Kino Mikro. Run by Maciej Gil, the Discussion Club was granted the Polish Film Institute Award in 2009. The Award was presented at the Polish Film Festival in Gdynia.

In April 2010, a digital projector was installed in the cinema, enabling the projections of 3D movies. In 2013, a branch of the cinema was opened in Galeria Bronowice (the Bronowice Gallery) at Stawowa Street 61.

Mikro is a member of the Europa Cinemas and the Sieć Kin Studyjnych i Lokalnych (the Studio and Local Cinema Network). The large screening room regularly hosts screenings organized by Kraków Film Festival, Off Camera and Copernicus Festival. Each year Mikro hosts a Review of Films on Autism and Asperger's syndrome. Iwona Nowak has been the cinema manager since 1992.

== Screening rooms ==
Mikro

- 123 seats

Mikroffala

- 14 seats

Bronowice (Note: External room at Galeria Bronowice, Stawowa Street 61, level one in the gallery.)

- 35 seats
