= Krzysztof Gierat =

Polish cultural activist

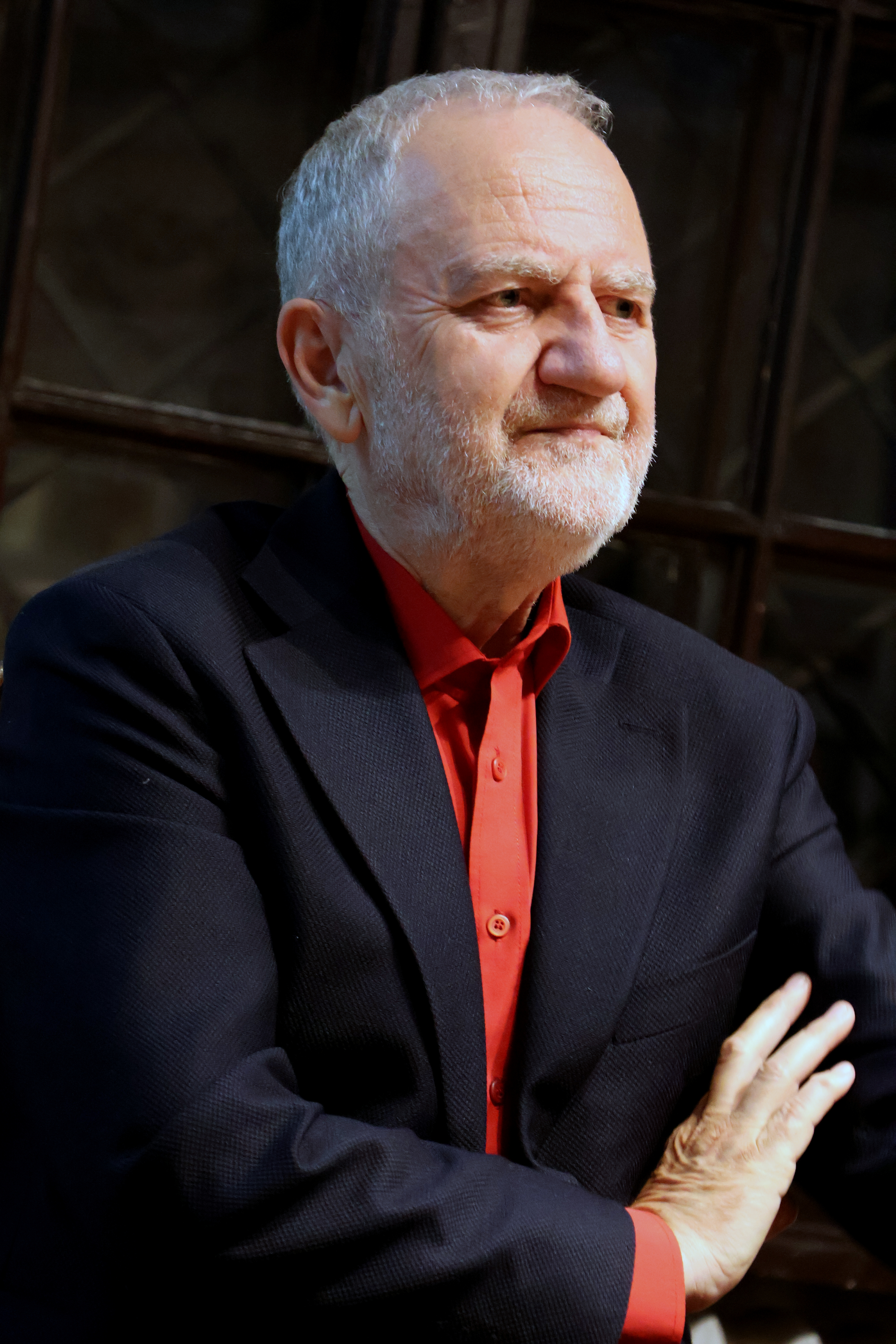
- Krzysztof Gierat, 2025
- Born: 16 April 1955; Żary
- Citizenship: Polish
- Education: Jagiellonian University
- Occupation: cultural activist

Krzysztof Gierat (born 16 April 1955) is a Polish cultural activist, film scholar, co-founder of the Jewish Culture Festival in Kraków, director of the Kraków Film Festival from 2000 to 2025, president of the Kraków Film Foundation until 2021, initiator of the Silent Film Festival. Vice-president of Kraków from 1993 to 1994. Member of the Polish Film Academy and the European Film Academy.

== Biography ==
He studied at the Jagiellonian University and pursued doctoral studies in film anthropology at the Institute of Art of the Polish Academy of Sciences in Warsaw. He was the manager of the Mikro Cinema in Kraków. He was a co-founder of the Jewish Culture Festival in Kraków. In 1990 he founded the Graffiti Film Center. In 1993–1994 he served as the Deputy Mayor of Kraków with responsibility for cultural affairs. He was the director of the Film Agency of Polish Television (TVP). In 2000 he assumed the directorship of the Kraków Film Festival and stewarded it for 25 years. He is a member of both the Polish Film Academy and European Film Academy and has served on juries at numerous international film festivals.

He worked as a co-producer on films such as Glass Lips, Jasminum, and Statyści. In 2024, he played a rabbi in White Courage, and in 2025, he played a Jewish tourist at the reception desk of the Rubinstein Hotel in Vinci 2.

== Books ==
- Kino i magia. Biblioteka „Powiększenia. Kraków: Krakowskie Wydawnictwo Akademickie. 1987.
- Skazany na kino. Krzysztof Gierat w rozmowie z Ewą Ziemblą. Kraków – Budapeszt – Syrakuzy: Klezmerhojs Wydawnictwo Austeria. 2025. ISBN 978-83-7866-782-7.
