= Hans von Kulmbach =

German artist (1480–c. 1522)

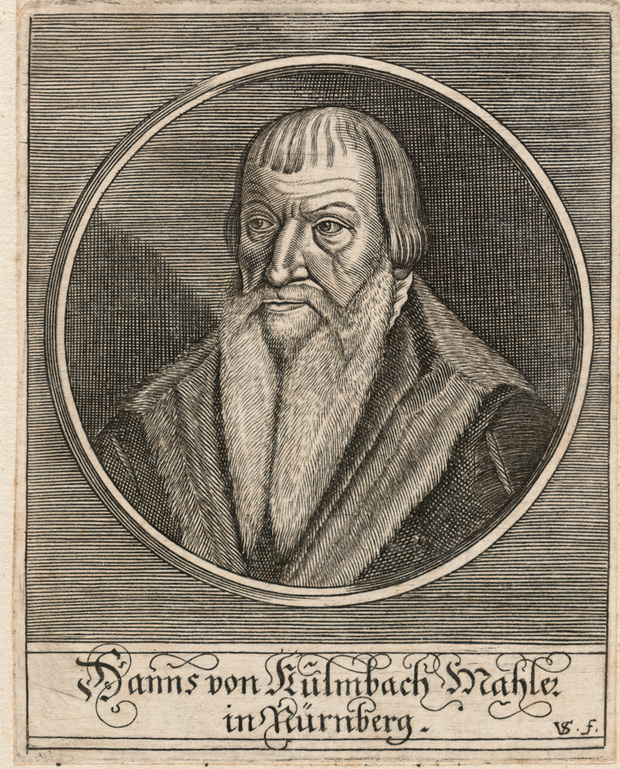
Portrait of Hans von Kulmbach

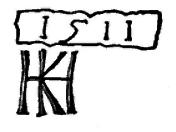
Signature from 1511

Hans Suess, known as Hans von Kulmbach (1480 in Kulmbach, Franconia – prior to 3 December 1522 in Nuremberg), was a German artist active in Poland. Hans von Kulmbach was the artist who created the Kraków St John's Altar.

== Life ==
Kulmbach probably arrived in Nuremberg around 1505. He received instruction by Jacopo de' Barbari, who for a time worked in Nuremberg. Von Kulmbach then apprenticed with Albrecht Dürer and after Dürer retired from painting altarpieces in 1510 Kulmbach took over most of his commissions. Kulmbach had his own workshop in Nuremberg and at times worked in Kraków. He also created artworks for emperor Maximilian I and for Margrave Casimir Hohenzollern von Brandenburg-Kulmbach. His best works were stained-glass windows in churches, such as the Maximilian stained-glass, Margrave stained-glass at St. Sebald in Nuremberg, the Welser stained-glass at the Frauenkirche and the Nikolaus altar at Lorenzkirche. In 1511 he finished the St. Mary's altar at Skałka in Kraków. The Catherine and St. John's altar also in Kraków, are among his best works.

== Gallery ==
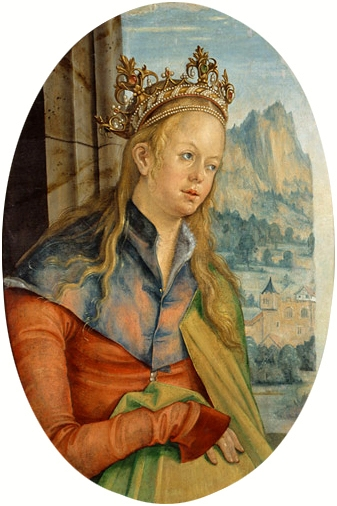
St Catherine of Alexandria (1511), Czartoryski Museum, Kraków

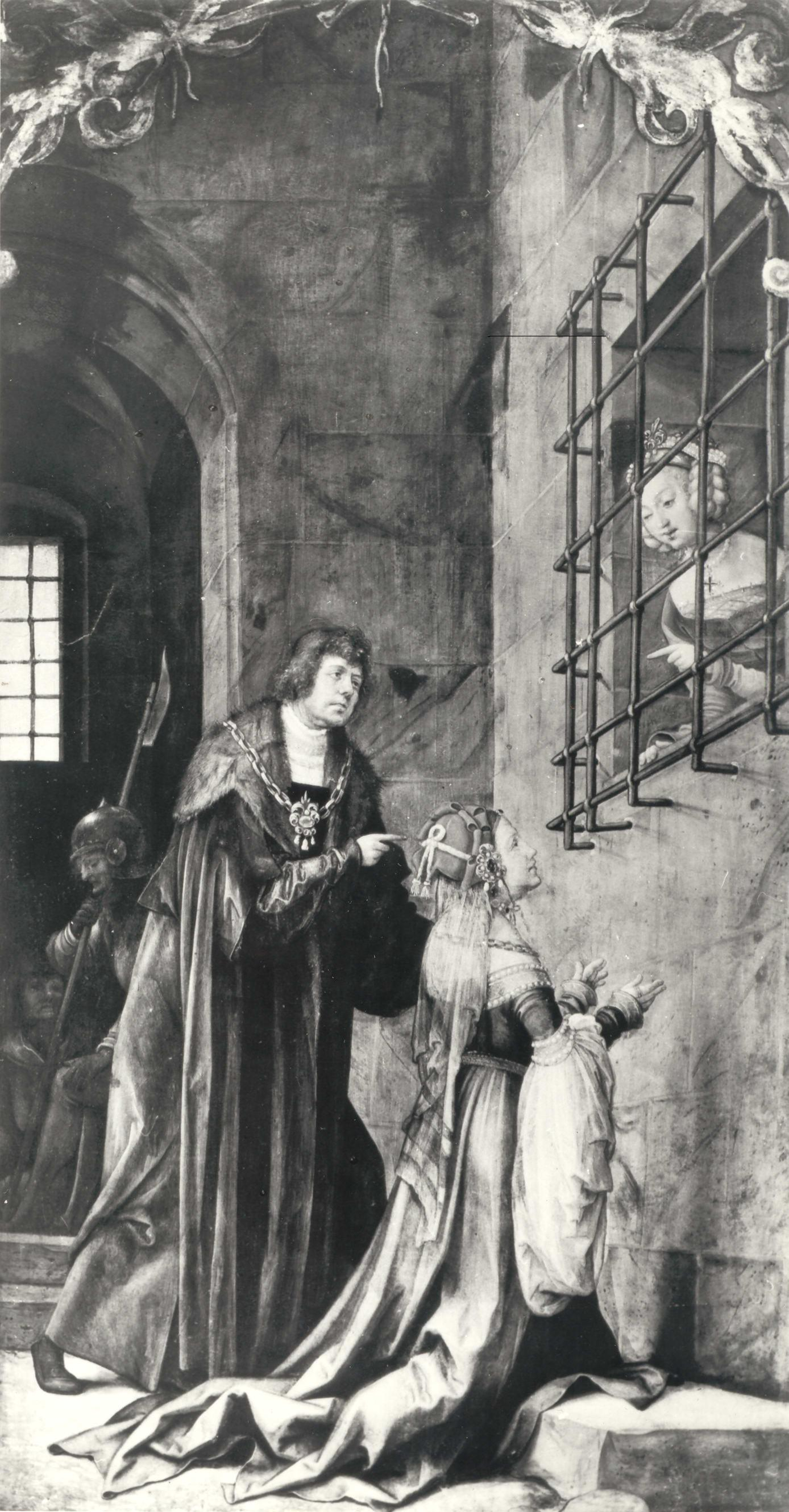
The conversion of Empress Faustina

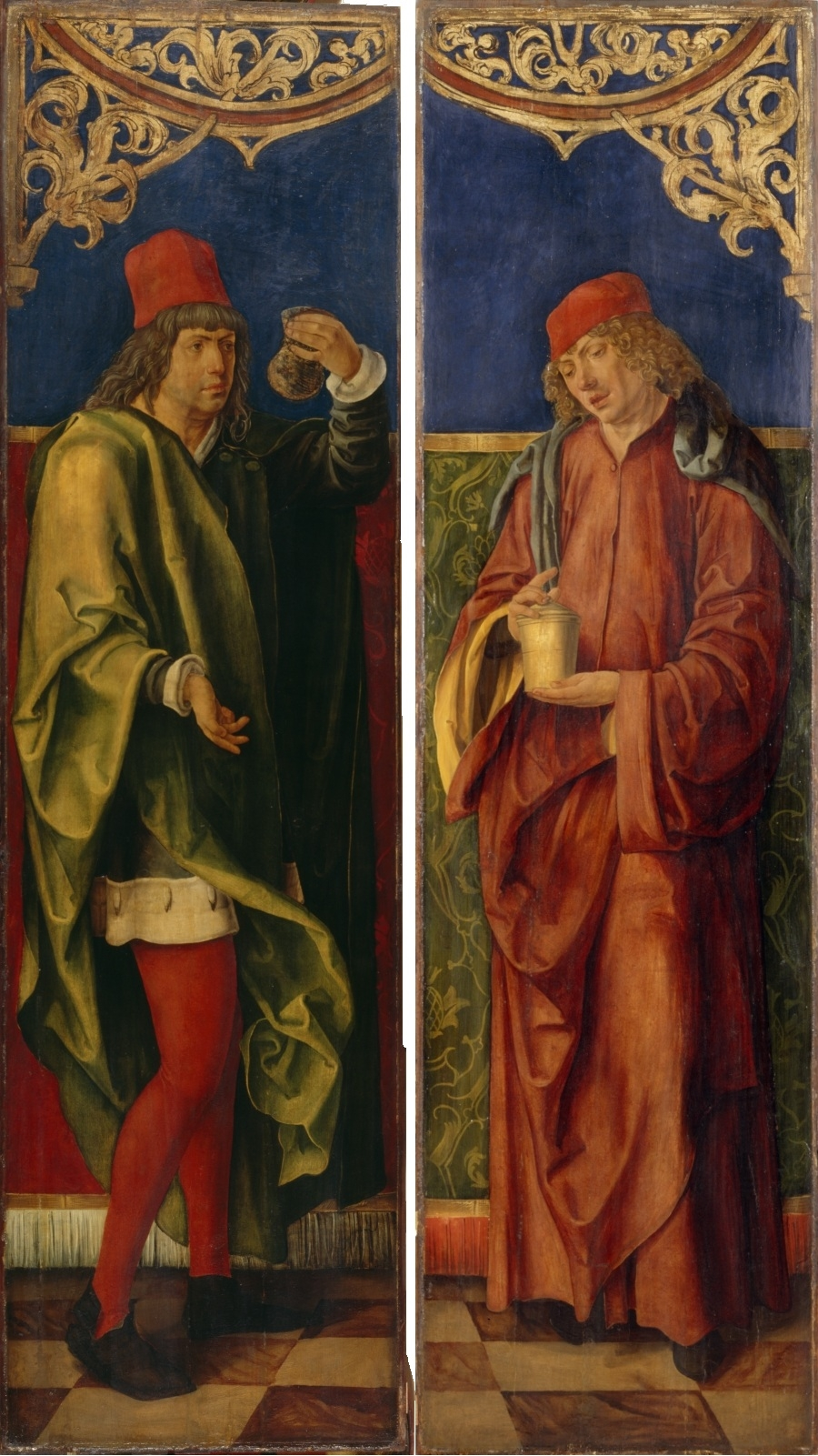
Nikolaus-Altar at St. Lorenz in Nuremberg by Kulmbach

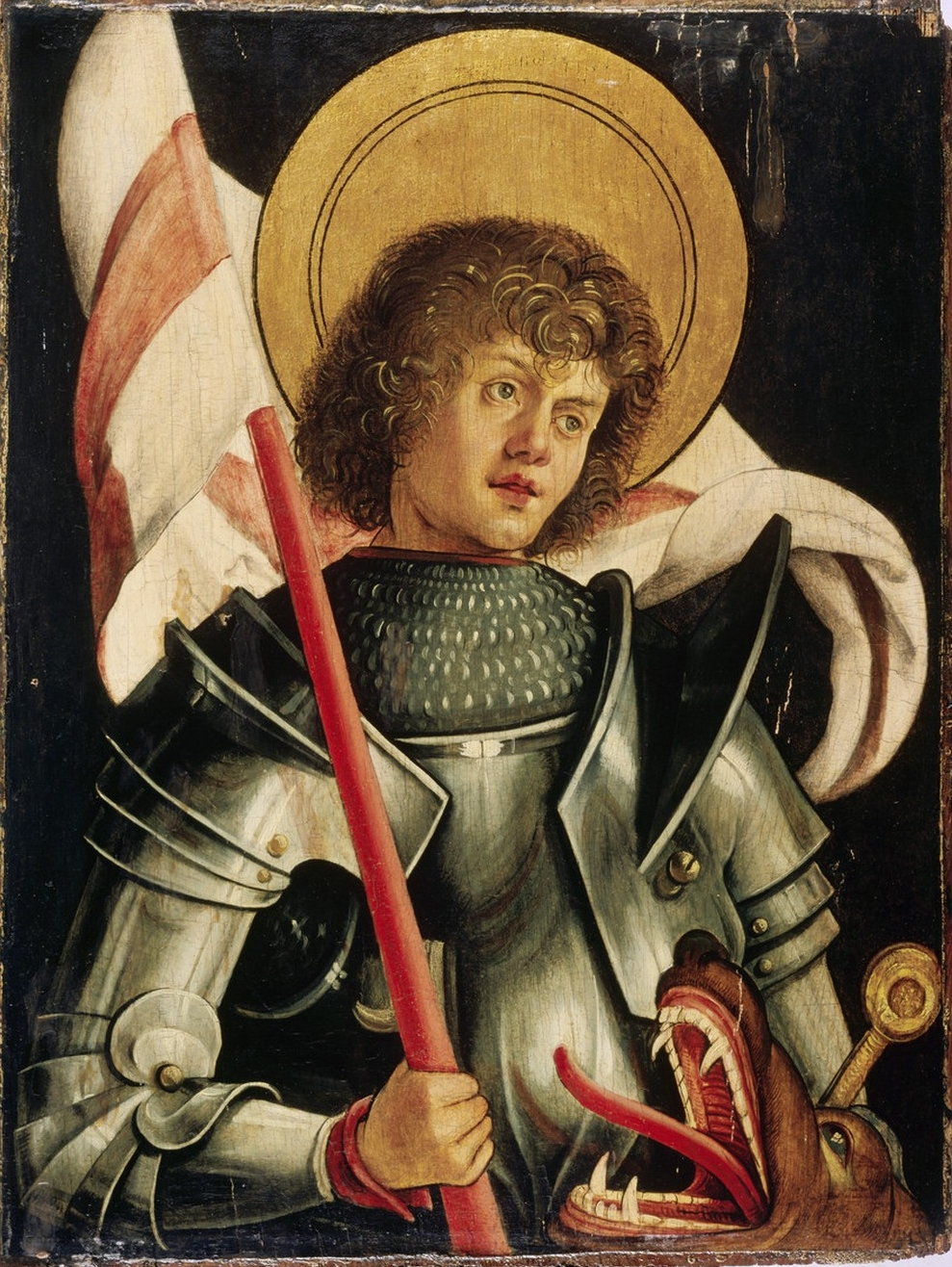
Saint George

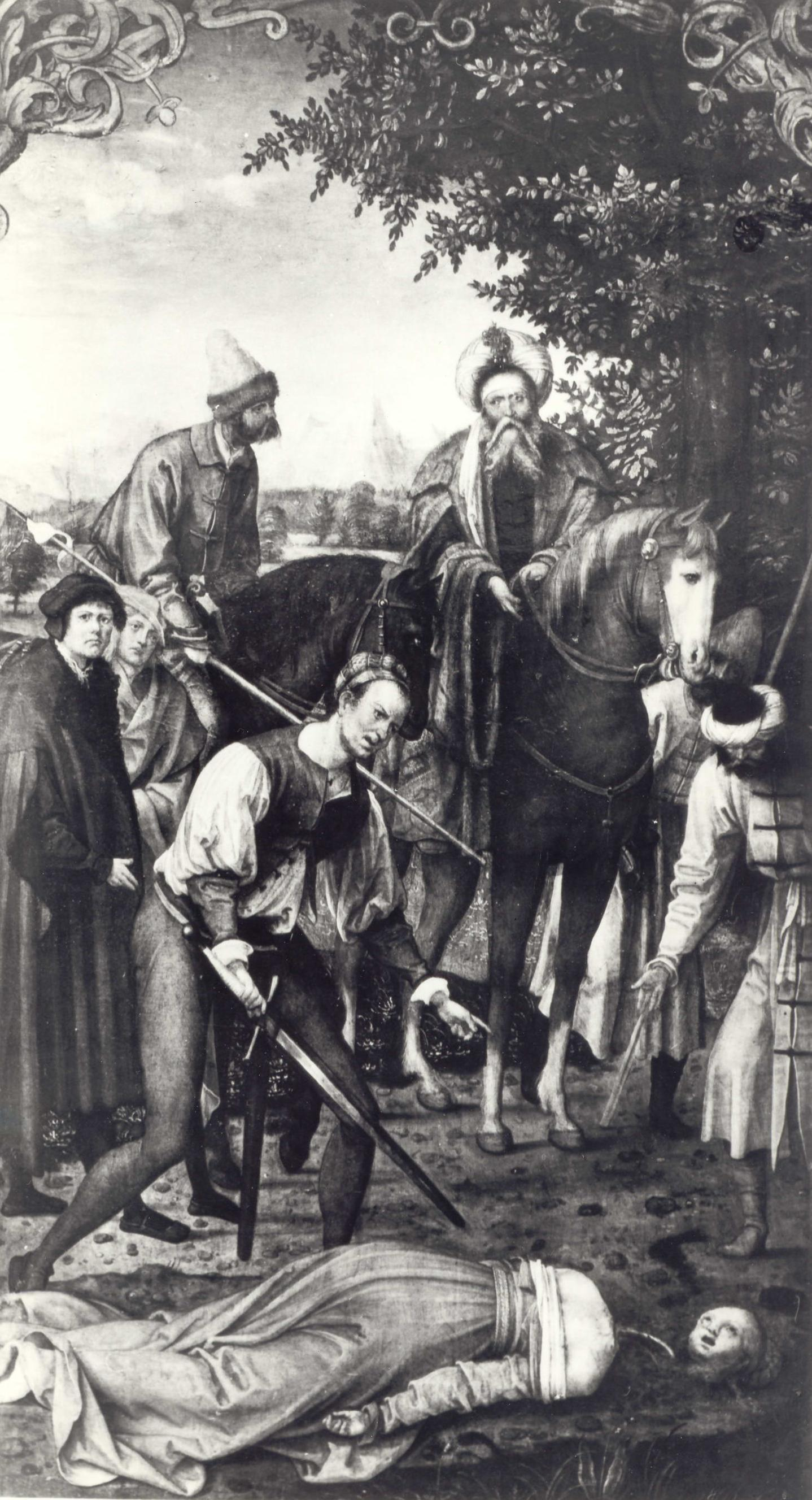
The Execution of St. Catherine of Alexandria

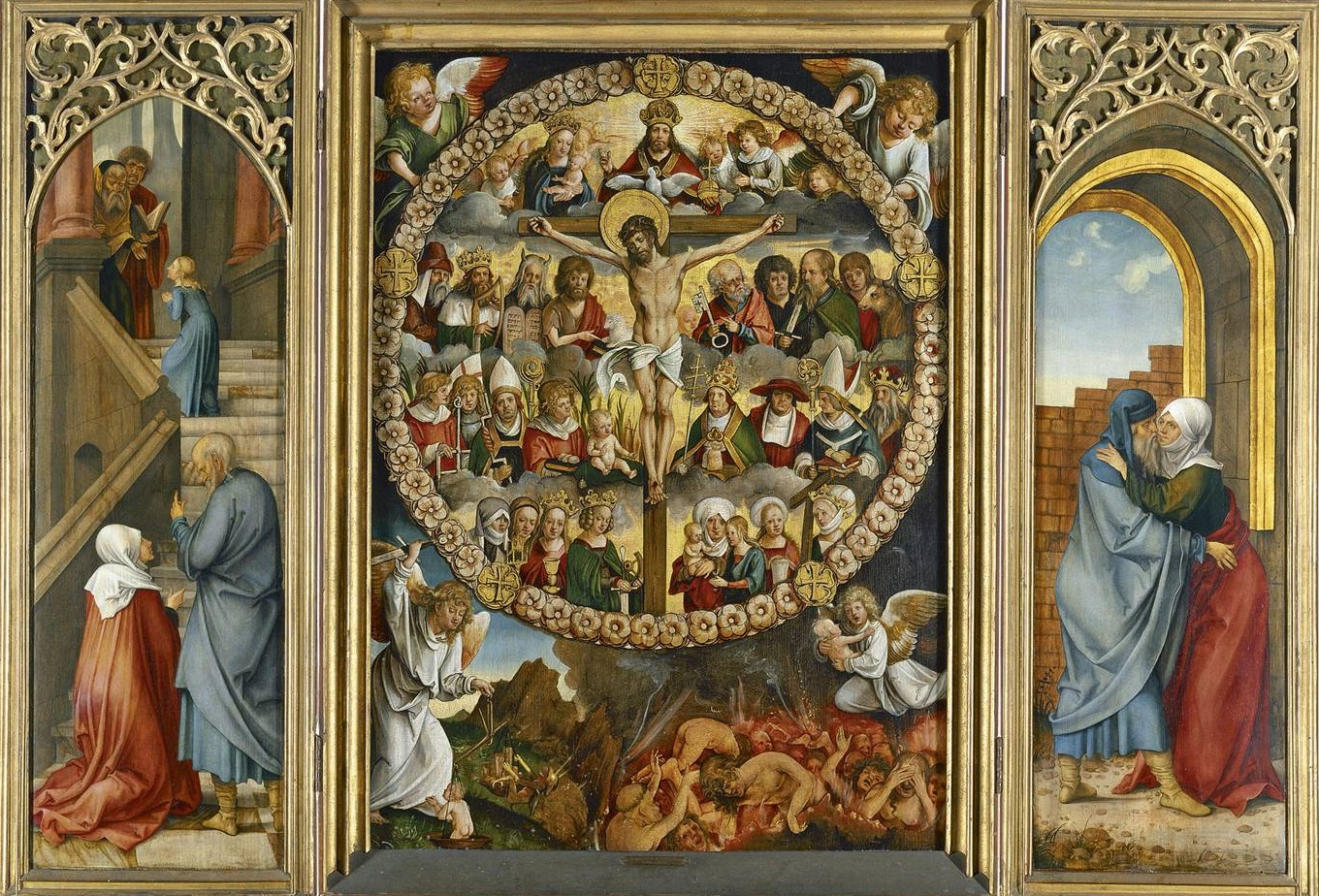
Triptych of the Rosary. c. 1510. Thyssen-Bornemizsa Museum, Madrid.

== See also ==
- History of Kraków
