= Jewish Culture Festival in Kraków =

Coordinates: 50°03′06″N 19°56′54″E

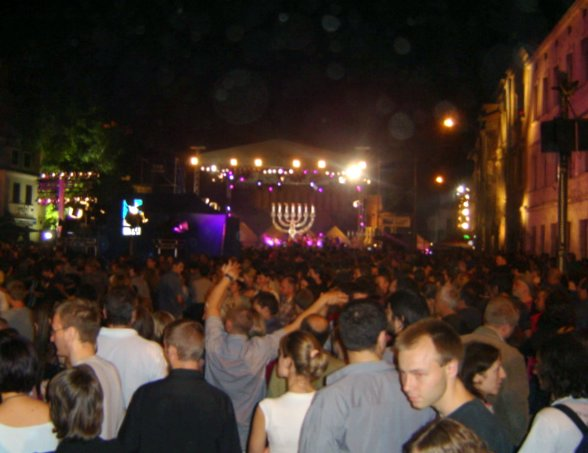
"Shalom in Szeroka Street", the final concert of the 15th Jewish Festival.

The Jewish Culture Festival in Kraków (Polish: Festiwal Kultury Żydowskiej w Krakowie, Yiddish: ייִדישער קולטור־פֿעסטיוואַל אין קראָקע) is an annual cultural event organized since 1988 in the once Jewish district of Kazimierz (part of Kraków) by the Jewish Culture Festival Society headed by Janusz Makuch, a self-described meshugeneh ("crazy person"), fascinated with all things Jewish. The main goal of the festival is to educate people about Jewish culture, history, and faith (Judaism), which flourished in Poland before the Holocaust, as well as to familiarize them with modern Jewish culture, developing mostly in the United States and Israel, and finally, to provide entertainment.

Each festival is held in late June or early July and takes nine days, from Saturday to Sunday. During that time concerts, exhibitions, plays, lectures, workshops, tours, etc. are organized. The two most important concerts are: the inaugural concert on the first Sunday, and the final concert on the last Saturday of the festival. The former usually takes place in one of seven synagogues of Kazimierz and features cantoral music; the latter is always held outdoors, in Ulica Szeroka, the main street of the Jewish part of Kazimierz, and features klezmer music. In between, there are many more concerts, usually with some variations of klezmer music.

The workshops provide an occasion to learn about traditional Jewish cuisine, dance, music, calligraphy and other aspects of Jewish culture. More about Jewish culture, as well as about topics related to the Holocaust, is taught at numerous lectures. Exhibitions of Jewish art, particularly paper-cut, are also organized. The program of the festival also includes tours of the synagogues and cemeteries of Kazimierz as well as the former Nazi-era Kraków Ghetto in the nearby district of Podgórze. During the festival Gentiles are also invited to watch or participate in Jewish prayers at the synagogue.

Jewish Culture Festival brings together artists of Jewish culture from all over the world – music bands, soloists, choirs, jazz musicians, and dance teachers. The festival promotes a whole variety of different styles of Jewish music: synagogue song, hasidic, classical, Jewish folk and – very popular in Krakow nowadays – klezmer. For the Poles this event is a way of promotion of Jewish culture and paying an homage to the community that used to live in Poland, although some Jews were reportedly offended by the commercialization of Polish Jewish culture. "Others argue that there is something deeper taking place in Poland as the country heals from the double wounds of Nazi and Communist domination."

It is one of Poland's major annual cultural events and one of the biggest festivals of Jewish culture in the world. Artists and entertainers usually associated with the festival include: Benzion Miller, Yaakov Stark, David Krakauer, Frank London, Leopold Kozłowski, Michael Alpert, Theodore Bikel, Paul Brody, and many others. Jewish dances are led by Steven Weintraub.

The co-founder of the festival was Krzysztof Gierat.

== See also ==
- Culture of Kraków
- Events in Krakow
- Taube Foundation for Jewish Life & Culture
- Festival of Jewish Culture in Warsaw
- Jewish culture
