= Siege of Kraków =

Battle in the Second Northern War between Sweden and the Polish-Lithuanian Commonwealth

Coordinates: 50°03′41″N 19°56′14″E

- Part of the Northern War of 1655–1660 and The Deluge
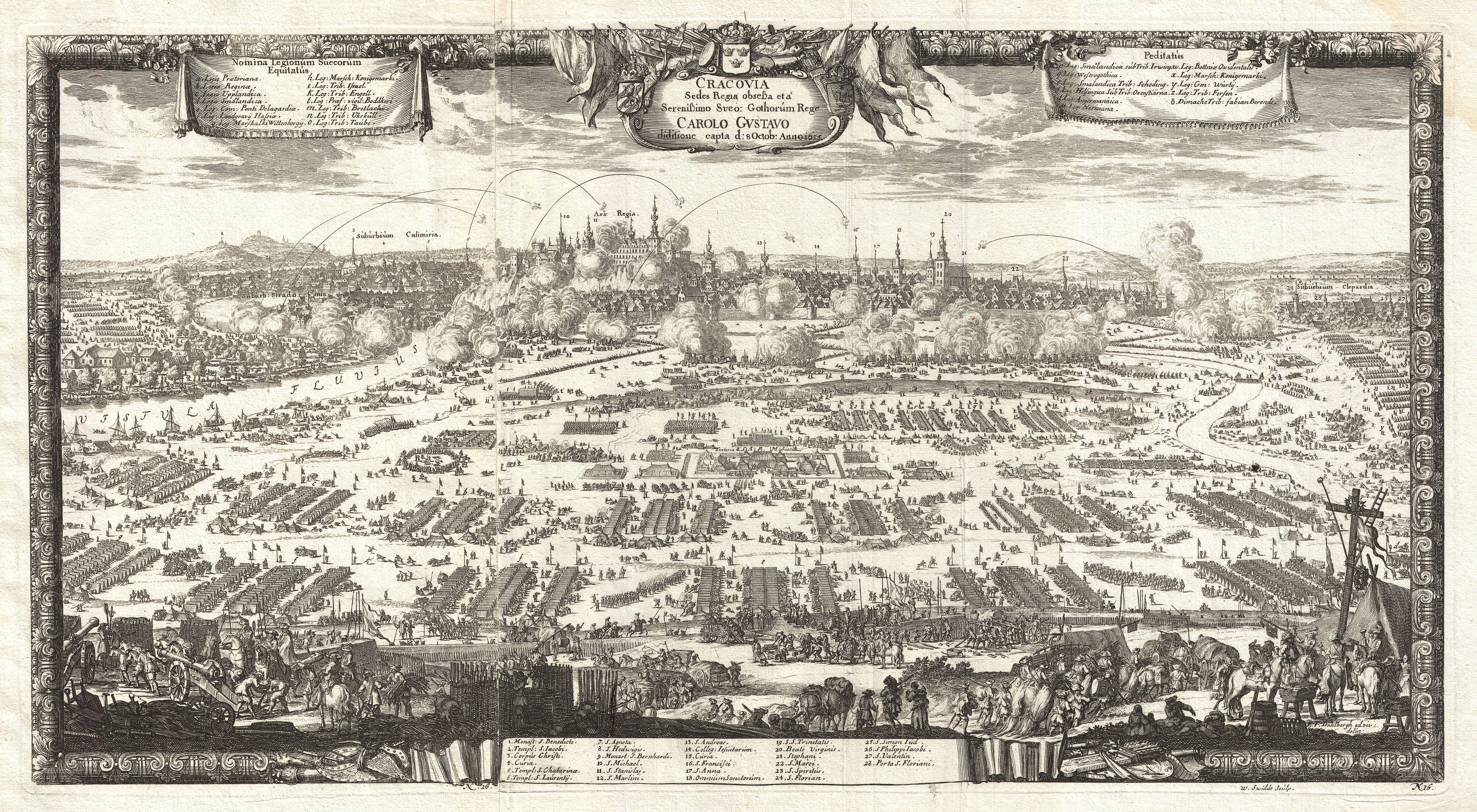
- Siege of Kraków, October 8, 1655
Date	September 25 – October 13, 1655
Location	Kraków, Poland
Result	Swedish victory
Territorial changes	Kraków is captured by the Swedes

Belligerents
Swedish Empire	Polish–Lithuanian Commonwealth

Commanders and leaders
(Swedish Empire) Charles X Gustav of Sweden (Swedish Empire) Arvid Wittenberg	(Polish–Lithuanian Commonwealth) Stefan Czarniecki

Strength
13,000–14,000 a few dozen cannons	2,200 soldiers 2,300 militia 160 cannons

The siege of Kraków was one of the battles during the Swedish invasion of Polish–Lithuanian Commonwealth (Second Northern War / Deluge). Lasting for two and a half weeks, it started on September 25 and ended on October 13, 1655. The capitulation treaty was signed on October 17, and Polish troops marched out of the city two days later. The city's defense was led by Kiev's castellan Stefan Czarniecki, while Swedish forces were commanded by King Charles Gustav and Arvid Wittenberg.

== Background ==
On August 2, 1655, when news of Swedish victories reached the city, the mayor of Kraków, Andrzej Cieniowicz, urged residents to organize defense of the ancient Polish capital. He also collected taxes for the employment of a 1,000-strong infantry unit. The garrison of Kraków was ordered to watch the city walls and control foreigners, especially Germans, who resided in the city. Furthermore, works on the fortifications were initiated under city engineer Izydor Affaita, and Krzysztof Mieroszewski of the local nobility. To cover the cost of the works, queen Marie Louise Gonzaga handed over some of her jewelry.

On August 27, the Bishop of Kraków Piotr Gembicki urged residents to pledge allegiance to the king and to defend the city. The bishop paid for 300 soldiers, who strengthened the garrison, while the city council created an armed militia consisting of students and other residents.

On September 19, the Polish king Jan Kazimierz came to Kraków, after the lost Battle of Żarnów. He brought a few thousand soldiers and levée en masse, but the morale of his army was low. Several members of the nobility abandoned the king, while the army, concentrated at Pradnik, organized itself into a confederation, demanding money and renouncing Hetman, Stanislaw Lanckoronski. On September 20, the Council of the Senate had a meeting, in which allegiance to the king was confirmed. Soon after the meeting, the queen, together with Primate Andrzej Leszczyński left the city.

On September 24, Jan Kazimierz, who had initially planned to stay in Kraków, decided to leave the city as well. Together with Bishop Gembicki, the king at first headed eastwards, to Wojnicz. He then turned south, to Nowy Wiśnicz, Nowy Sącz, and the Polish border.

== Siege ==
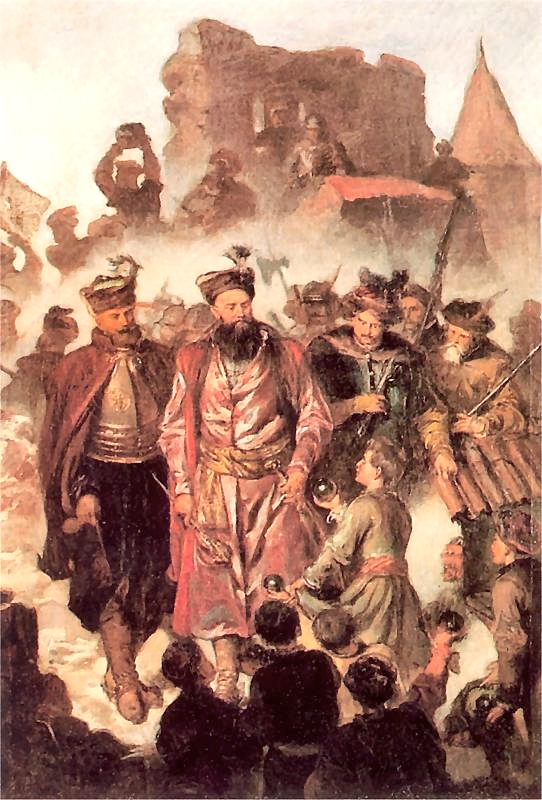
Stefan Czarniecki defending Kraków in 1655

The garrison of Kraków, under Castellan Stefan Czarniecki and colonel of infantry Fromhold Wolff, consisted of some 5,000 men—soldiers of the regular army, plus city militia. In order to prepare the defense, Czarniecki burned the suburbs of Kleparz, Biskupie and Garbary, and constructed a system of earthworks.

On September 25, the Swedes attacked Kazimierz, pillaging it after capture. On the same day, they tried to enter Kraków itself, but a Polish counterattack forced them to retreat. The next day, the Swedish king Charles Gustav ordered an artillery barrage, leaving Arvid Wittenberg with 8,000 soldiers. Gustav himself headed with a smaller army towards Wojnicz, where he once again defeated the Poles in the Battle of Wojnicz on October 3. News of this battle quickly reached Kraków, together with Swedish demands for capitulation. Since Polish royal army units, scattered around the city, did not engage themselves in any skirmishes with the Swedes, the defenders of Kraków felt abandoned, without hope of any support. Nevertheless, they continued to fight.

On October 6, Charles Gustav returned to Kraków, and while inspecting Swedish positions, his horse was killed by a Polish bullet, near St. Florian's Gate. As the siege progressed, morale among the defenders sank even lower. Well aware of this, Czarniecki initiated negotiations on October 12. Further resistance would mean the destruction of Kraków and starvation of its residents, so on the next day, Czarniecki agreed to capitulate.

== Capitulation ==
On October 17, a truce was signed with the Swedes. It guaranteed freedom of religion, safety of the Roman Catholic clergy, civil servants and residents, keeping all privileges of the city and its university, and exchange of prisoners of war. The Swedes allowed Polish units to leave Kraków, and march to winter quarters in western Lesser Poland, near Oświęcim, Zator, Sławków and Siewierz. These forces were to remain neutral until November 18. After that date, they had to decide whether to join the Swedish or the Polish king.

Czarniecki's forces gathered at Kraków's Main Square on October 19. Some 1,800 men with 12 cannons left the city, while Czarniecki was invited by Charles Gustav to a feast. Soon afterwards, 2,500 Swedish infantry plus 500 reiters entered Kraków. The Swedish king came to the city on the afternoon of October 19. After meeting the city council, he visited Wawel with its Cathedral church. The Swedes immediately broke the agreement, imposing high taxes and robbing churches. Altogether, the booty stolen by the Swedes was estimated at 5 million złoty.
