= Kraków Film Festival =

Film festival in Kraków, Poland

Coordinates: 50°03′41″N 19°56′14″E

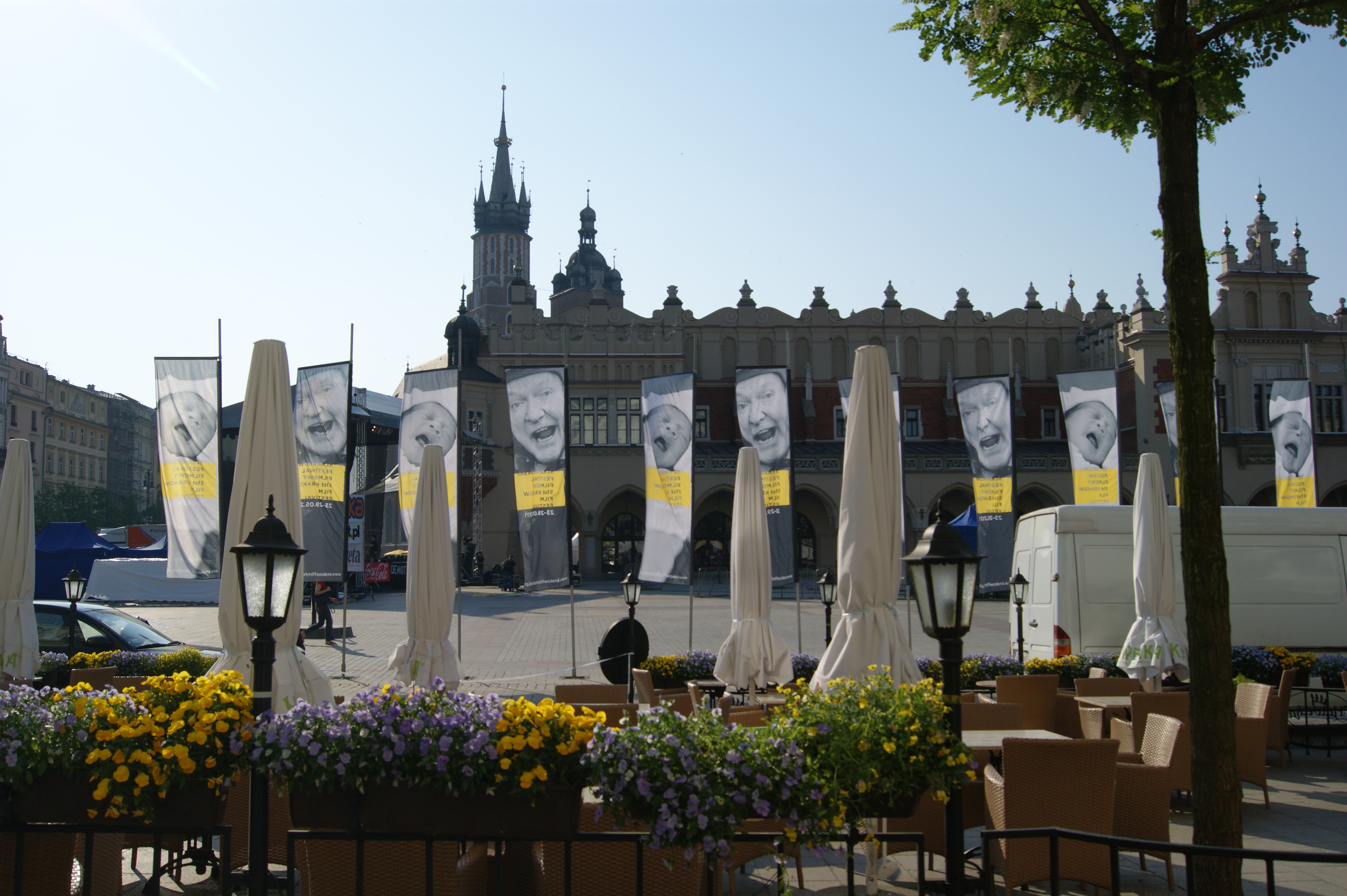
- Location: Kraków, Poland
- Founded: 1961; 65 years ago
- Most recent: 2026
- Festival date: May 31 — June 7, 2026
- Language: International
- Website: Kraków Film Festival

Current: 66th
- 67th 65th

The Krakow Film Festival (Polish: Krakowski Festiwal Filmowy) is one of Europe's oldest events dedicated to documentary, animation and other short film forms.

It is one of the only five FIAPF accredited documentary and short film festivals in the world.

Kraków Film Festival has been organised every year since 1961. The Artistic President of the festival is Krzysztof Gierat.

It was in Kraków that Polish filmmakers such as Krzysztof Kieślowski, Wojciech Wiszniewski, Bogdan Dziworski, and Marcel Łoziński began their career. It was also here that the directors of animated films, including Ryszard Czekała, Jerzy Kucia, Julian Antonisz (Antoniszczak), Piotr Dumała, and Zbigniew Rybczyński, winner of the Academy Award for Best Animated Short Film for the film Tango, made their debut.

Aside from documentary filmakers and animated film directors, Krakow has also honored feature film directors, such as: Pier Paolo Pasolini, Werner Herzog, Zoltán Huszárik, Jaromil Jireš, Claude Lelouch, Patrice Leconte, Mike Leigh, and the recent Oscar laureate, Jan Svěrák.

Since 1998, the Festival grants an international life achievement award called the "Dragon of Dragons". Its first laureate was Polish documentary maker Bohdan Kosiński.

== Dragon of Dragons Award winners ==
- 1998 – Bohdan Kosiński
- 1999 – Jan Lenica
- 2000 – Raymond Depardon
- 2001 – Jan Švankmajer
- 2002 – Werner Herzog
- 2003 – Stephen i Timothy Quay
- 2004 – Albert Maysles
- 2005 – Yuri Norstein
- 2006 – Kazimierz Karabasz
- 2007 – Raoul Servais
- 2008 – Allan King
- 2009 – Jerzy Kucia
- 2010 – Jonas Mekas
- 2011 – Piotr Kamler
- 2012 – Helena Třeštíková
- 2013 – Paul Driessen
- 2014 – Bogdan Dziworski
- 2015 – Priit Pärn
- 2016 – Marcel Łoziński
- 2017 – Witold Giersz and Daniel Szczechura
- 2018 – Sergei Loznitsa
- 2019 – Caroline Leaf
- 2020 – Péter Forgács
- 2021 – Piotr Dumała
- 2022 – Jarmo Jääskeläinen
- 2023 – Michael Dudok de Wit
- 2024 – Jacek Petrycki
- 2024 – Godfrey Reggio

The unique character of the Krakow Film Festival derives not only from the programme of the competition screenings, the Dragon and Hobby Horse prizes awarded by an international and Polish jury, the Prix UIP Kracow, the FIPRESCI, and the FICC awards or numerous other prizes granted outside festival regulations, but also from the programme of accompanying events.

== See also ==
- Cinema of Poland
- International Festival of Independent Cinema Off Plus Camera held in Kraków
