= Havelka =

Havelka (feminine Havelková) is a Czech surname. Notable people with the surname include:

- Filip Havelka (born 1998), Czech footballer
- František Havelka (1906–1973), Czech boxer
- Helena Havelková (born 1988), Czech volleyball player
- Libuše Havelková (1924–2017), Czech actress
- Niko Havelka (born 1999), Croatian footballer
- Ondřej Havelka (born 1954), Czech swing singer
- Pavel Havelka (born 1965), Czech canoeist
- Roman Havelka (1877–1950), Czech painter
- Svatopluk Havelka (1925–2009), Czech composer
- Vladimíra Havelková (born 1966), Czech canoer

== See also ==
- Hawełka
