= Ondřej Havelka a jeho Melody Makers =

Czech big band

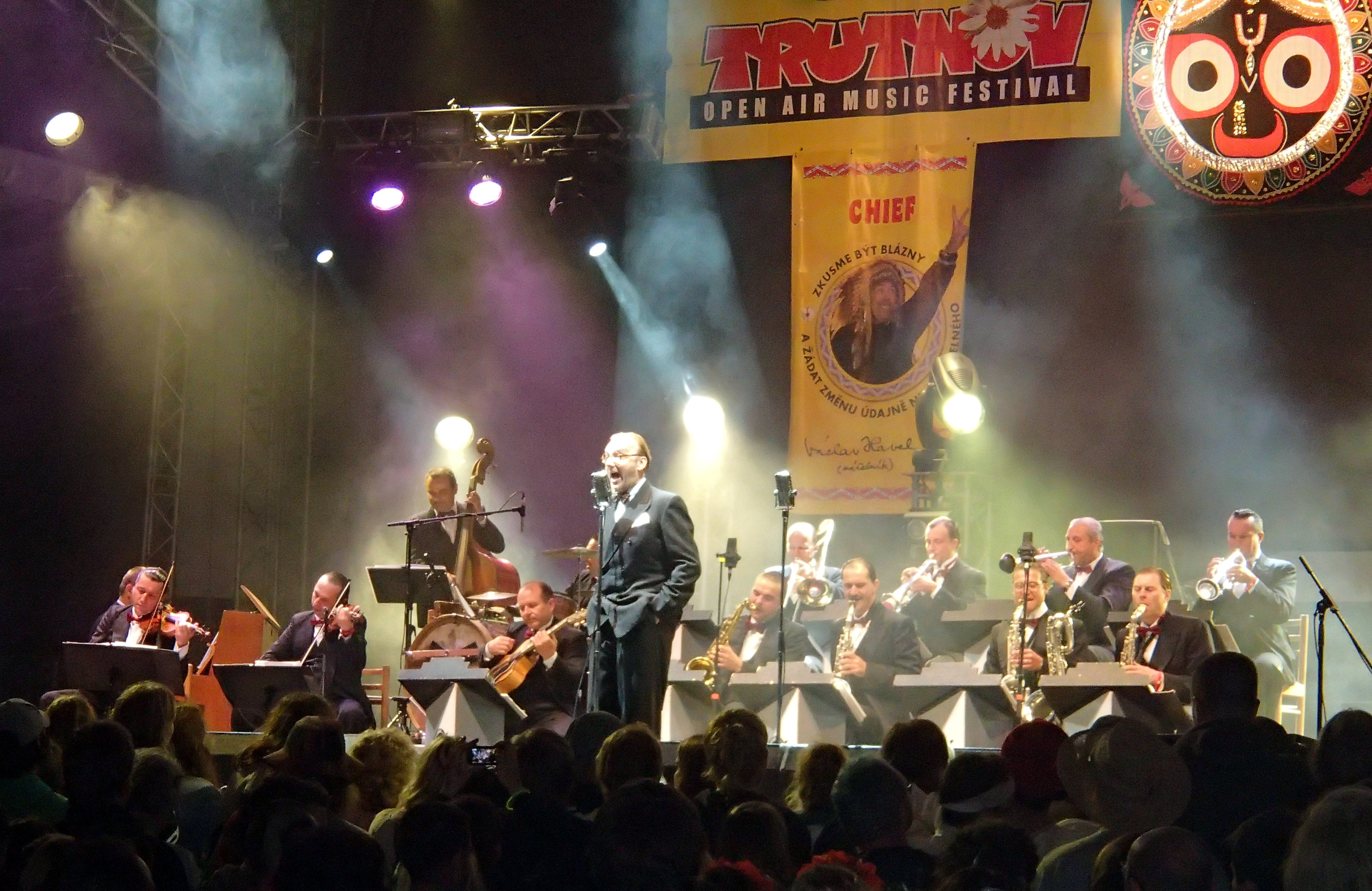
- Ondřej Havelka a jeho Melody Makers performing in 2012

Background information
- Also known as: Melody Makers
- Origin: Prague, Czech Republic
- Genres: Jazz; swing
- Years active: 1995–present
- Spinoff of: Original Prague Syncopated Orchestra
- Members: Ondřej Havelka; Juraj Bartoš; Michal Krása; Jiří Patócs; Michal Plecitý; Petr Tichý; David Maxa; Miroslav Lacko; Petr Vlášek; Pavel Jordánek; Martin Tříska; Jan Tříska; Bedřich Šmarda; Martin Zbrožek; Jiří Sládek
- Past members: Karel Majer; Věra Gondolánová
- Website: melodymakers.cz

Ondřej Havelka a jeho Melody Makers (lit. 'Ondřej Havelka and his Melody Makers'), or simply Melody Makers, is a Czech big band formed by Ondřej Havelka in 1995 in Prague. They primarily play American jazz standards and Central European jazz and swing music of the 1920s and 1930s.

== History ==
After leaving the jazz group Original Prague Syncopated Orchestra in 1995, actor and singer Ondřej Havelka, son of actress Libuše Havelková and composer Svatopluk Havelka, with his colleague Karel Majer, formed a 14-member big band, which they called Ondřej Havelka a jeho Melody Makers; Majer left after a year.

== Band members ==
Current

- Ondřej Havelka – vocals
- Juraj Bartoš – trumpet, bandleader
- Michal Krása – trumpet
- Jiří Patócs – trumpet
- Michal Plecitý – trombone
- Petr Tichý – guitar
- David Maxa – drums
- Miroslav Lacko – piano
- Petr Vlášek – double bass
- Pavel Jordánek – alto saxophone, clarinet
- Martin Tříska – alto saxophone, clarinet
- Jan Tříska – tenor saxophone, clarinet
- Bedřich Šmarda – tenor saxophone, baritone saxophone, bass saxophone, clarinet
- Martin Zbrožek – violin
- Jiří Sládek – violin

Past

- Karel Majer – bandleader
- Věra Gondolánová – vocals

== Discography ==
=== Albums ===
- Mě to tady nebaví (1998)
- Šťastný nový rok '98 (1998)
- Jen pro ten dnešní den (1999)
- Rhapsody in Blue: Pocta George Gershwinovi (1999)
- Swing It (2000)
- Sing, Sing, Sing featuring Sestry Havelkovy (2001)
- Vzpomínky na hvězdný prach (2002)
- Nejlepší kusy z repertoiru Ondřeje Havelky a jeho Melody Makers (compilation, 2003)
- Tentokrát zcela rozvrkočení (2005)
- Ondřej Havelka a jeho Melody Makers vám přejí veselé vánoce. Bílé a oranžové (2005)
- Rhapsody in Blue Room (2007)
- Saturnin (2010)
- Dávají perly swingu (2012)
- Kríze sem, kríze tam... (2014)
- Nás to tady furt baví (2015)
- Cole Porter with Magdalena Kožená (2017)
- Swing nylonového věku (2021)
- Nebe Na Zemi with Adam Plachetka (2023)

=== DVDs ===
- Ondřej Havelka uvádí téměř kompletní almanach filmových písní (2007)
- Potkal jsem svůj sen (2012)
