= Jama Michalika =

Cafe in Krakow, Poland

Coordinates: 50°03′51″N 19°56′27″E

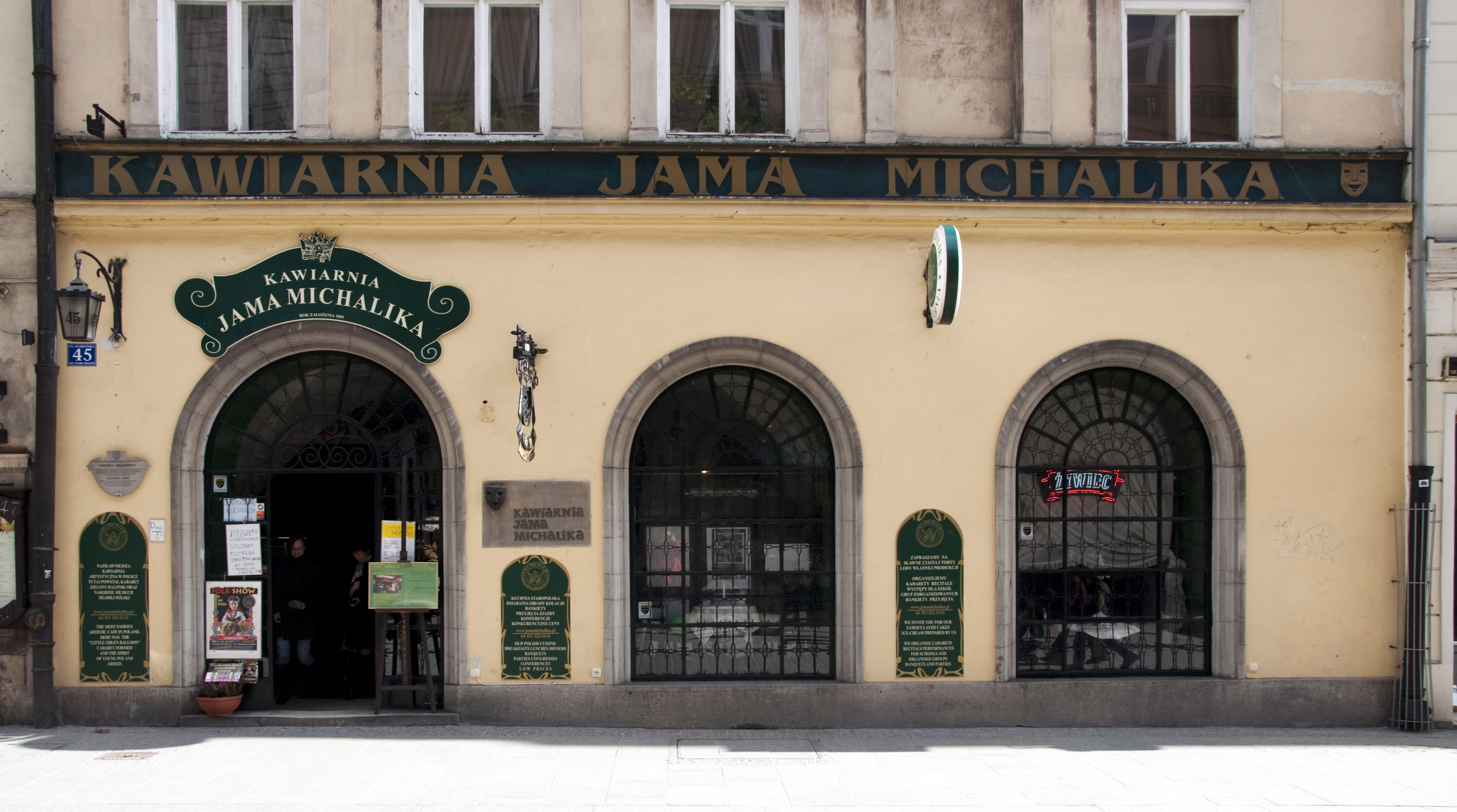
Jama Michalika in Kraków

Jama Michalika is a historic café in Kraków, Poland, established in 1895. It is located at Floriańska Street in Kraków, the capital of the Lesser Poland region.

Jama Michalika (lit. Michalik's Den in Polish) is one of the oldest Kraków cafes. It was founded in 1895 by Jan Apolinary Michalik as Cukiernia Lwowska (Lwów Confiserie). The current name, also translated as the Michalik's Cave, came into existence because initially Michalik could afford only a single room in the back, without any windows. The central location in the Ulica Floriańska 45 as well as the patisserie offering and the invitation to students from the nearby Academy of Fine Arts to dine there free of charge in exchange for their small works of art, the cafe became quickly popular.

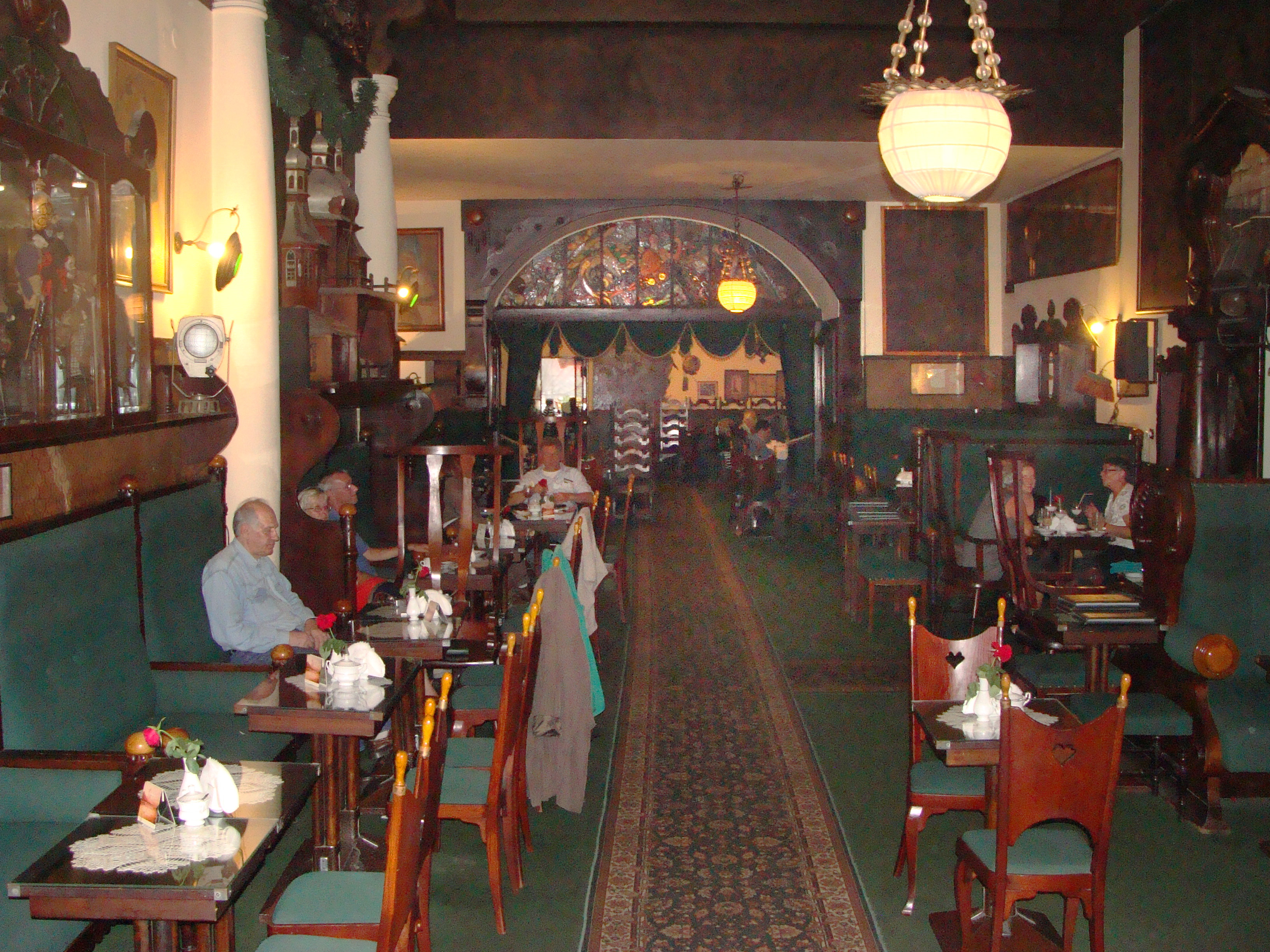
Interior of Jama Michalika

In 1905, the cabaret Zielony Balonik (Green Balloon) began staging performances at the café. As a highlight of every cabaret evening was the appearance of a puppet theatre designed and produced for widely popular shows against bigotry and imperial censorship, by Bronisława Janowska among others. Some of the puppets depicted prominent Cracovians. A selection of those historic puppets are displayed at the cafe. The interior is decorated with Art Nouveau furniture, mirrors, stained glass, lamps and cabinets.

== See also ==
- Antoni Hawełka
- Café Noworolski
- Wierzynek
