= Golden Head Tenement =

Tenement House Under the Golden Head
- Kamienica Pod Złotą Głową
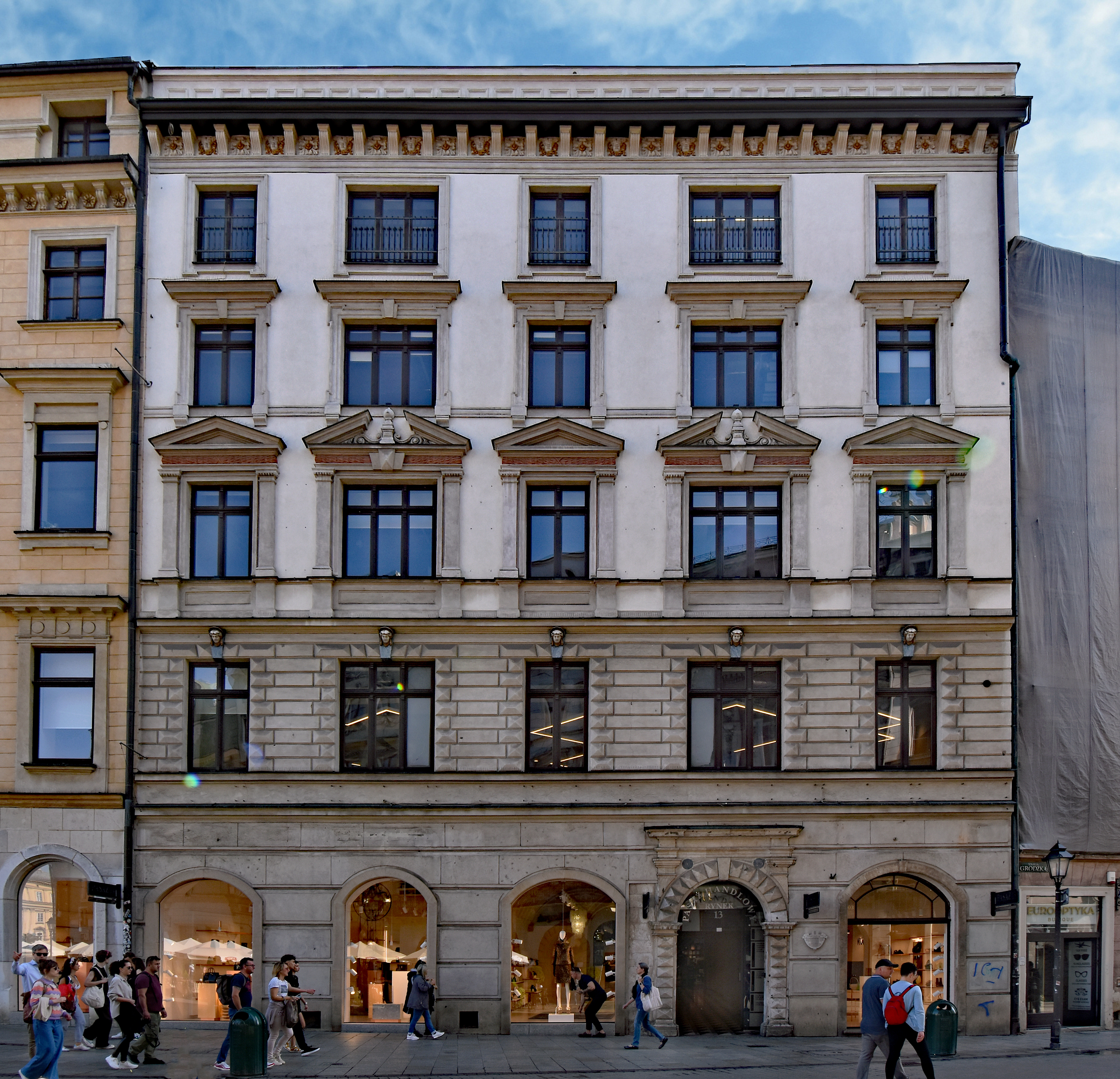

General information
- Location: 13 Main Square, Kraków, Poland
- Coordinates: 50°03′36.8″N 19°56′17.1″E
- Completed: 14th century

Pod Złotą Głową Tenement House (Polish: Kamienica Pod Złotą Głową) is a tenement house located at 13 Main Square in Kraków in the District I Old Town.

The construction of the tenement house was completed in the 14th century. Over the following centuries, it was repeatedly rebuilt, including in the 15th century, 18th century, 19th century, and in 1938.

In 1853, General Józef Chłopicki lived in this tenement house.

On April 18, 1968, the tenement house was entered into the Polish register of monuments. It is also entered into the municipal register of monuments of the Lesser Poland Voivodeship.

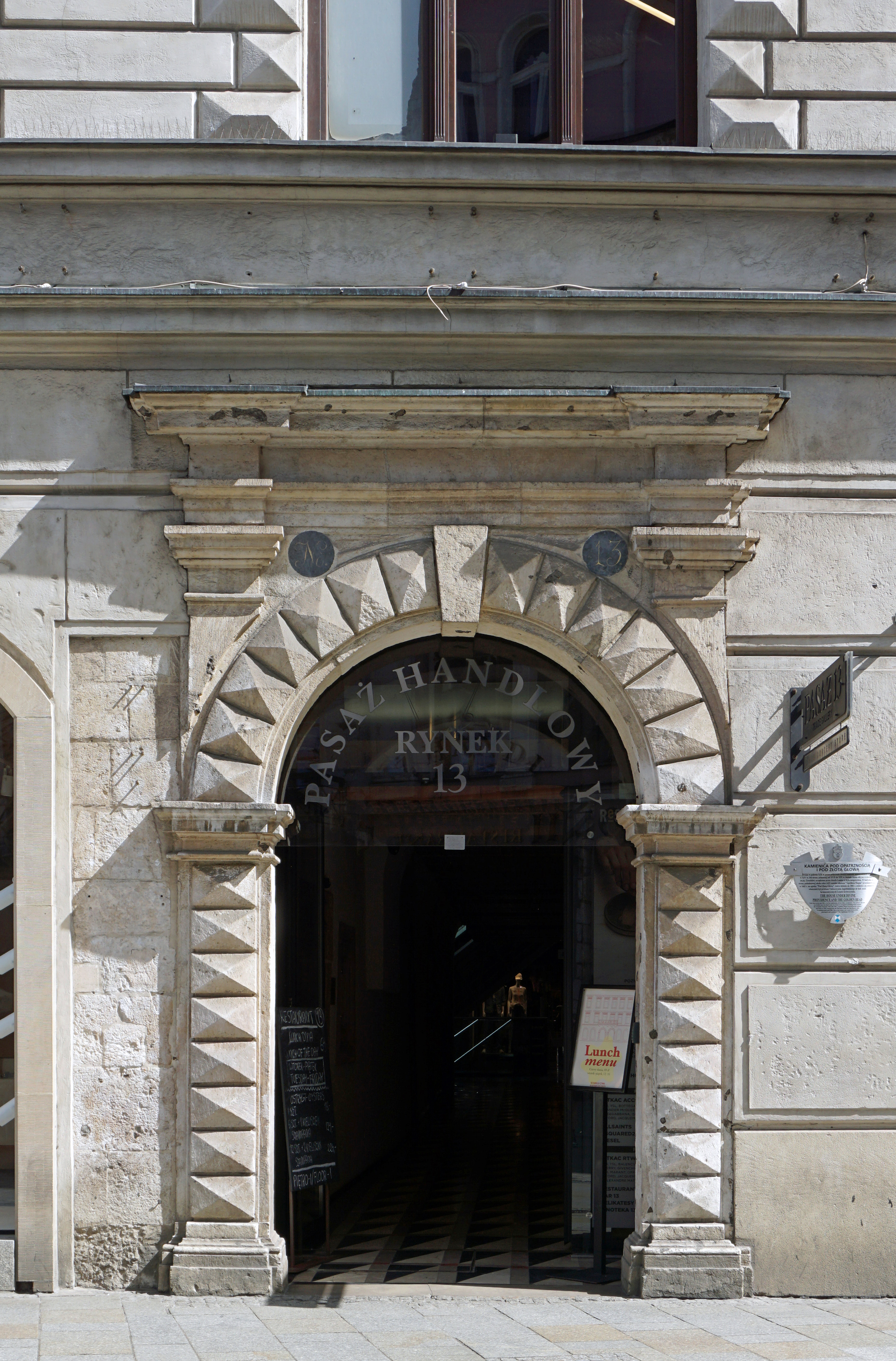
Portal
