= Hawełka =

Hawełka is a Polish-language surname of Czech origin, with the corresponding Czech surname being Havelka. In German language, the same Czech surname was phonetically transliterated as Hawelka.

Hawełka or Hawelka may refer to:

- Antoni Hawełka (17 January 1840 – 14 January 1894), Polish merchant and caterer
- Josefine Hawelka (1913–2005), Café Hawelka founder and operator, wife of Leopold
- Leopold Hawelka (April 11, 1911 – December 29, 2011), Austrian coffee house, Café Hawelka, founder and operator, husband of Josephine

== See also ==
- Café Hawelka
