= Café Noworolski =

Iconic cafe in Kraków, Poland

Coordinates: 50.0614°N 19.9374°E

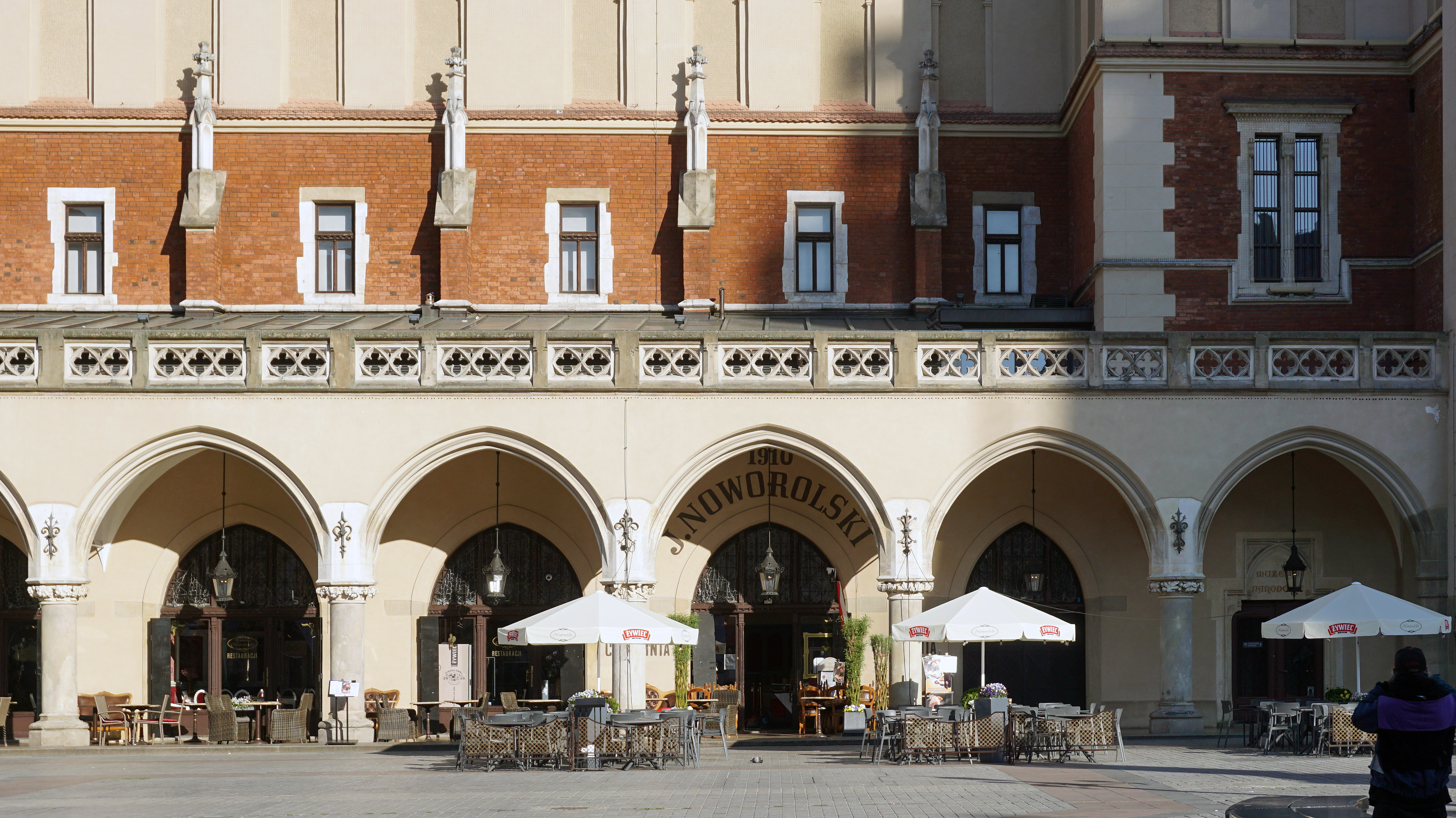
Café Noworolski (2025)

Noworolski is a café located at the ground floor of the Cloth Hall, Kraków, Lesser Poland. It is considered one of the most famous cafes in Kraków.

The tradition of the Noworolski dates to 19th century, through the opening of the renovated cafe under its current name took place in the years 1910–1912. It became popular among the elite of Kraków, with artists and professors, thereby competing with Jama Michalika. It hosted famous persons such Jacek Malczewski, Wojciech Kossak, Włodzimierz Tetmajer, Julian Fałat, Fryderyk Pautsch, Karol Hukan, Ludwik Puget, and Karol Hubert Rostworowski.

During the Nazi occupation the cafe was requisitioned and access allowed only to Germans. The family Noworolski again lost the place in 1949, when the cafe was nationalized by the communists and renamed. After the fall of communism, the café was restituted to the family in 1992.

== See also ==
- Antoni Hawełka
- Wierzynek
