= Krakonoš a lyžníci =

1980 Czech comedy film by Vera Plívová-Šimková

Krakonoš a lyžníci (Krakonoš and the Skiers) is a Czech comedy film released in 1981.

Set in the Czech mountains on the Polish border, in a predominantly poor society, this film combines a fairy tale with reality: the protagonists (two young brothers from a poor family) meet a man that to them is the mythological "Man of the Mountains" also known as the Krakonoš, who rewards those who come to the mountains with good intentions and punishes those who come with bad in their heart. He is said to be a very magical being, and that is what makes the children think that the man they have met is the Krakonoš, because in their eyes he can fly. Of course, he is not actually flying: the film is set when skiing was unheard of, so a man with long wooden sticks on his feet that speeds over the snow would seem like a magical being. However, the person that they befriend is actually a smuggler, who occasionally crosses the Polish border to bring goods that the poor people on the Czech side can actually afford. Naturally, the border police are constantly trying to catch him, so the two boys soon find themselves wound up in rather complex situation, all portrayed with a great sense of humour.

== Cast ==
- Milan Padalik as Jenda Pelc
- Jan Kreidl as Matěj, Jenda's brother
- Viktor Kral as Vítek Trompetr, son of the innkeeper
- Vanda Krnanska as Rozicka Vichrová
- Ondrej Havelka as Teacher
- Karel Hermanek as Paserák Krakonoš
- Rene Martan as Vašek
