= Original Prague Syncopated Orchestra =

Czech jazz band

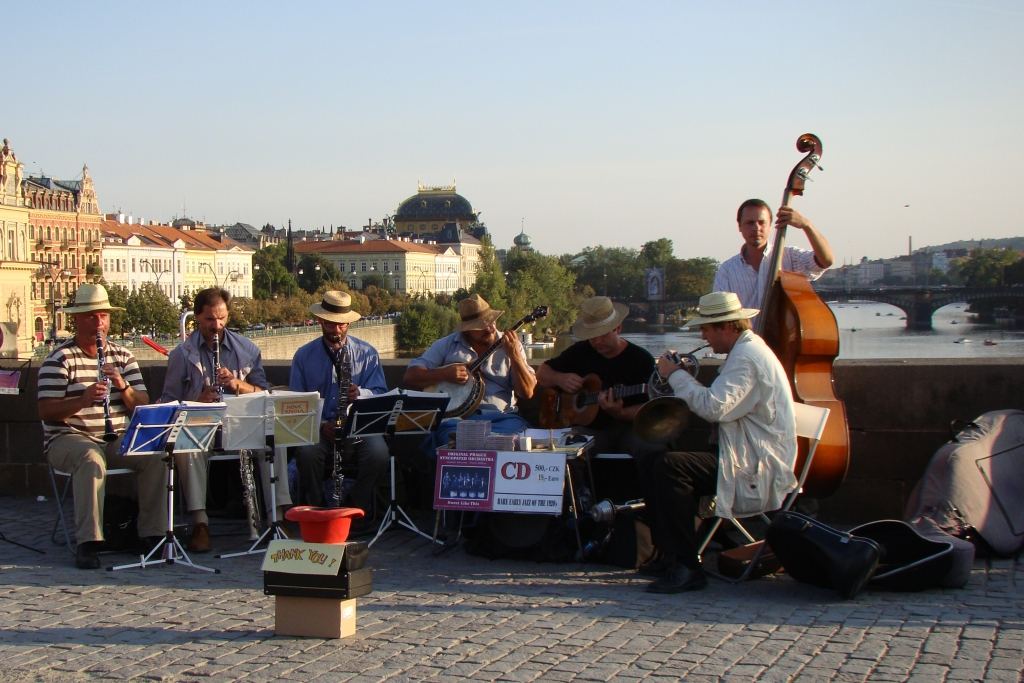
- OPSO in 2009

Background information
- Also known as: Originální Pražský Synkopický Orchestr; OPSO
- Origin: Prague, Czechoslovakia
- Genres: Jazz; swing; blues
- Years active: 1974–present
- Spinoffs: Ondřej Havelka a jeho Melody Makers
- Members: Michal Chomiszak; Jan Pospíšil; Vojtěch Pospíšil; Matěj Šmíd; Antonín Dlapa; Tomáš Mika; Jan Brabec; Pavel Jurečka; Jiří Gilík; Iva Blažková; Alice Bauer
- Past members: List of past members
- Website: original-prague-syncopated-orchestra.com

The Original Prague Syncopated Orchestra (Czech: Originální Pražský Synkopický Orchestr or OPSO) is a Czech band formed in Prague, in what was then Czechoslovakia, in 1974. They are best known for performing American music popular in the 1920s and 1930s, such as jazz, blues, and swing.

The initial lineup of OPSO was a five-man band consisting of three wind instruments, a piano, and a banjo, under the artistic direction of musicologist Pavel Klikar, who also founded the ensemble. Three more members joined in 1976: a second saxophone, a violin, and vocalist Ondřej Havelka. A year later, the band's roster expanded to twelve members, consisting of three reed instruments, three trumpets, a sousaphone, a banjo, a piano, two violins, and a drum kit. OPSO went on to release five studio albums and a live record in this lineup. In 1995, Havelka departed and formed his own group in Berlin, initially titled Golden Prague Syncopated Orchestra and eventually renamed Ondřej Havelka a jeho Melody Makers, also taking with him several members of OPSO. The Original Prague Syncopated Orchestra continues to perform, and they have released four more studio albums and one compilation.

== Band members ==
=== Current ===
- Michal Chomiszak – trumpet
- Jan Pospíšil – saxophones, clarinet
- Vojtěch Pospíšil – saxophones, clarinet
- Matěj Šmíd – trombone, vocals
- Antonín Dlapa – banjo, guitar
- Tomáš Mika – banjo
- Jan Brabec – banjo
- Pavel Jurečka – double bass, sousaphone
- Jiří Gilík – piano
- Iva Blažková – piano
- Alice Bauer – vocals

=== Past ===
1974–1977:

- Pavel Klikar – cornet, mellophone, piano; bandleader
- Jan Štolba – clarinet, alto saxophone
- František Rubáš – clarinet, tenor saxophone, bass saxophone
- Tomáš Velínský – trombone
- Zbyněk Malý – violin, Stroh violin
- Jura Gilík – piano, clarinet
- Jiří Šícha – banjo
- Ondřej Havelka – vocals

1978–1987:

- Pavel Klikar – cornet, trumpet, mellophone, piano; bandleader
- Oleg Petruš – cornet, trumpet
- Michal Krása – trumpet
- Tomáš Velínský – trombone, vocals
- Jan Štolba – clarinet, alto saxophone
- František Rubáš – clarinet, tenor saxophone, bass saxophone
- Pavel Jordánek – clarinet, alto saxophone
- Jan Burle – clarinet, alto saxophone
- Luboš Hajný – clarinet, tenor saxophone
- Václav Harmáček – clarinet, alto saxophone
- Zbyněk Malý – violin, Stroh violin, vocals
- Zuzana Ondřejčková – violin, Stroh violin
- Kateřina Trnavská – violin
- Radim Sedmidubský – violin
- Jura Gilík – piano, clarinet, harmonica, vocals
- Jiří Šícha – banjo
- Jaroslav Pospíšil – guitar
- Jiří Malý – guitar
- Michal Pospíšil – sousaphone, double bass
- Michal Hejna – drums, xylophone, marimba
- Ondřej Havelka – vocals

1987–onward:

- Jan Šimůnek – violin, Stroh violin
- Petr Vyoral – violin
- Pavel Jordánek – clarinet, soprano saxophone
- Tomáš Jirák – clarinet, soprano saxophone
- Tomáš Černý – clarinet, alto saxophone
- Roman Novotný – clarinet
- Petr Kroutil – clarinet, alto clarinet
- Michal Zpěvák – clarinet, soprano saxophone, tárogató
- Vojtěch Pospíšil – clarinet, bass clarinet
- Jakub Šnýdl – clarinet
- Jan Tříska – clarinet
- Zbyněk Dobrohruška – banjo
- Petr Tichý – guitar
- Antonín Šturma – guitar
- Petr Wajsar – guitar
- Jiří Šícha – guitar
- Marek Rejhon – guitar
- Antonín Šturma – double bass
- Ondřej Landa – double bass
- Ondřej Balcar – double bass
- Martin Zpěvák – double bass
- Josef Šťastný – double bass, sousaphone
- Jiří Gilík – piano
- Alice Bauer – vocals
- Adéla Zejfartová – vocals

== Discography ==
- Original Prague Syncopated Orchestra at Breda Jazz Festival (live, 1979)
- Originální Pražský Synkopický Orchestr (1979)
- Stará, Natoč Gramofon (1982)
- Jazz & Hot Dance Music 1923–31 (1984)
- Sám s Děvčetem v Dešti (1989)
- Hello Baby (1994)
- Walking and Swinging (1996)
- Blues pro Tebe (1998)
- Goin' Crazy with the Blues (2002)
- Sweet Like This (2006)
- Legendární Gramofonové Snímky Z Let 1976–89 (compilation, 2019)
