= Krzysztofory Palace =

Historic building in Kraków, Poland

Pod Krzysztofory Palace
- Pałac Pod Krzysztofory
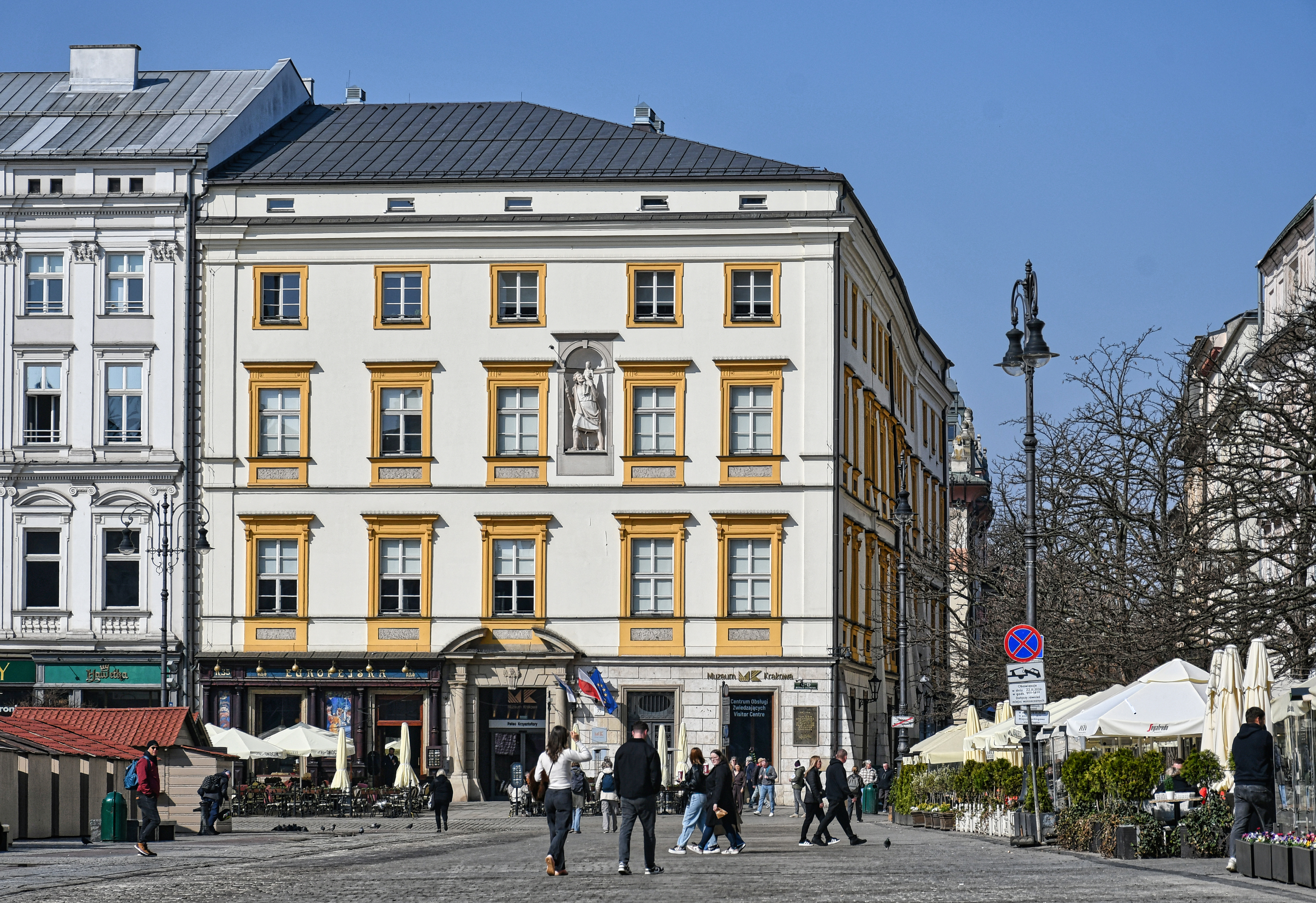
- Interactive map of the Pod Krzysztofory Palace area

General information
- Type: city palace
- Location: 35 Main Market Square; Kraków; Poland
- Coordinates: 50°03′46″N 19°56′11.5″E

UNESCO World Heritage Site
- Type: Cultural
- Criteria: iv
- Designated: 1978
- Part of: Historic Centre of Kraków
- Reference no.: 29bis

Historic Monument of Poland
- Designated: 1994-09-08
- Part of: Kraków historical city complex
- Reference no.: M.P. 1994 nr 50 poz. 418

The Krzysztofory Palace or Pod Krzysztofory Palace (Polish: Pałac Krzysztofory) also called (Polish: Pałac Pod Krzysztofory), is a historic, baroque city palace located at 35 Main Market Square in Old Town of Kraków, Poland.

It is the location of the Historical Museum of Kraków.

== History ==
Between 1640 and 1649 the Palace was owned by the Crown Court Marshal Adam Kazanowski, who also commissioned its construction. The palace is named after St. Krzysztof, the patron saint of medieval tenements. It was designed by joining together three narrow Gothic houses. The first major renovation of the palace was done by the architect Jakub Solari in 1682–1684. One of its unique features is the fine stucco work by Italian architect Baldassare Fontana, who was working in Kraków at the time. Towards the end of the 19th century, the ground floor was taken up by a popular restaurant Pod Palmą founded by Antoni Hawełka, purveyor to the imperial court of Vienna.

The Krzysztofory Palace is the headquarters of Muzeum Krakowa, being transferred to the jurisdiction of this institution in 1965. The current exhibition at Krzysztofory Palace is "Krakow from the beginning, to no end.". As the name suggests, it presents the whole history of Krakow from its beginnings in the prehistoric mythical King Krakus to the modern times, having the final piece of the exhibition always being changed according to the events in Krakow.

This exhibition includes many iconic pieces connected to Krakow, such as the Lajkonik costume, the traditional Krakow nativity scenes (including a life-size scaled version), mascarons; those particularly related to local institutions, such as the silver rooster of the Fowler Brotherhood from the 16th century, the ring and scepter of Krakow mayors from the same century, the counter of the Krakow Merchant Congregation from the 18th century, but also works signed with the names of Jan Matejko, Józef Mehoffer, Zofia Stryjeńska, Jacek Malczewski, Wojciech Weiss and Wlastimil Hoffman.

Besides this exhibition, the historic interiors of the renovated palace include a library and archive, educational, administrative, commercial, gastronomic spaces and a conference hall. Also in these renovated premises there are events like concerts, literary meetings, debates, lessons and educational workshops.

The opening of the “Krakow from the beginning, to no end” exhibition is the last element of the project implemented by the Museum of Krakow “Krzysztofory anew – Complete Museum: modernization and renovation of the Krzysztofory Palace along with adapting its functions to the implementation of the tasks of a modern, multifunctional museum facility”. 85% of the investment (over PLN 29 million) was implemented thanks to the European Funds, namely Priority Axis VIII – Protection of Cultural Heritage and Development of Cultural Resources under the Infrastructure and Environment Operational Programme 2014–2020. The remaining 15% of the investment costs were covered by the Municipality of Krakow.
