= Main Square, Kraków =

Urban square in the Old Town of Kraków, Poland

Main Market Square
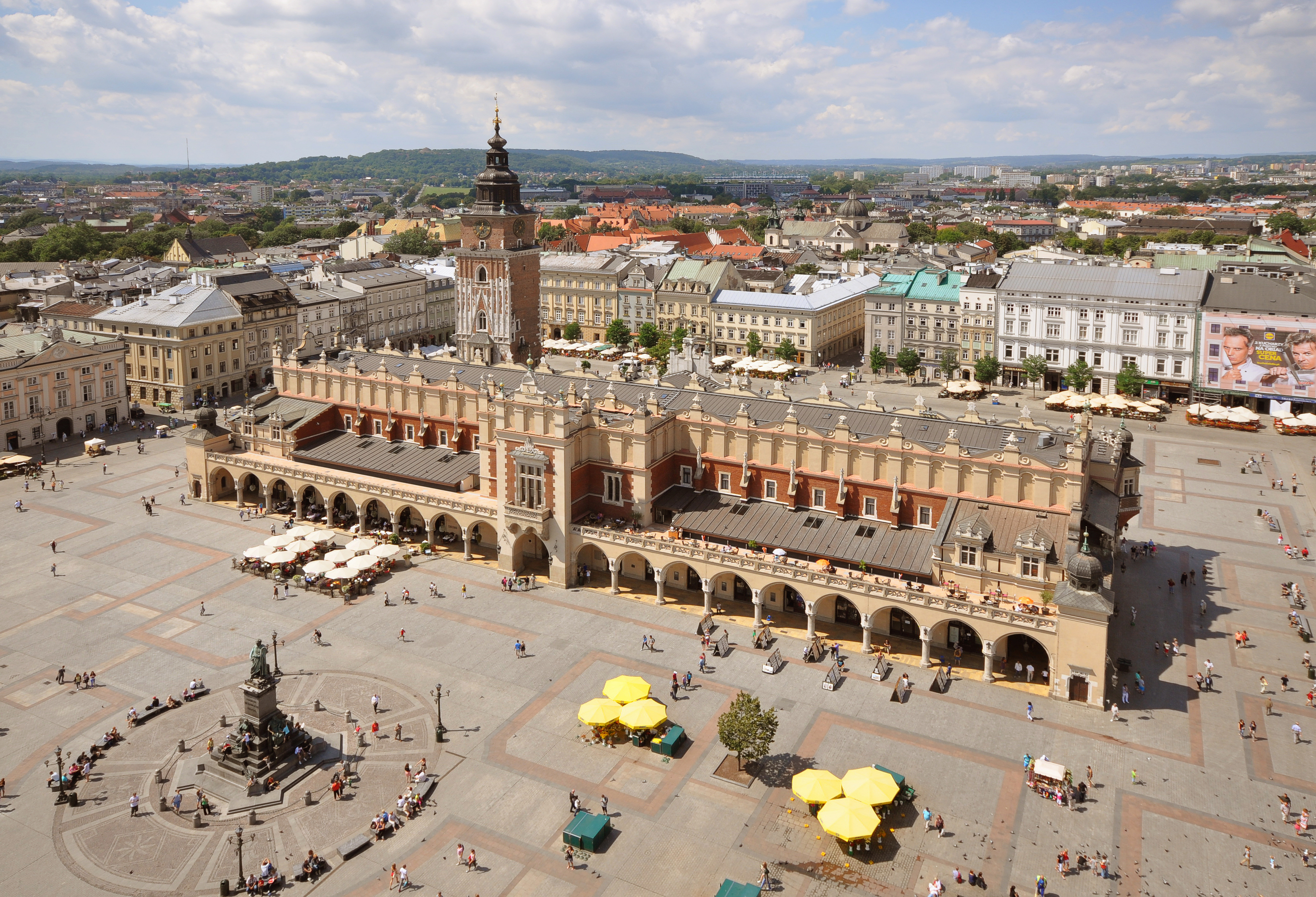
- Main Square as seen from the tower of the St. Mary's Basilica, with Cloth Hall in its centre, free-standing Town Hall Tower behind it, and the Adam Mickiewicz Monument in the bottom-left
- Interactive map of Main Market Square
- Native name: Rynek Główny (Polish)
- Namesake: Rynek
- Type: Medieval market square
- Maintained by: Kraków City Council
- Location: Kraków Old Town; Poland
- Coordinates: 50°3′42″N 19°56′14″E

UNESCO World Heritage Site
- Type: Cultural
- Criteria: iv
- Designated: 1978
- Part of: Historic Centre of Kraków
- Reference no.: 29
- Region: Europe and North America

Historic Monument of Poland
- Designated: 1994-09-08
- Part of: Kraków historical city complex
- Reference no.: M.P. 1994 nr 50 poz. 418

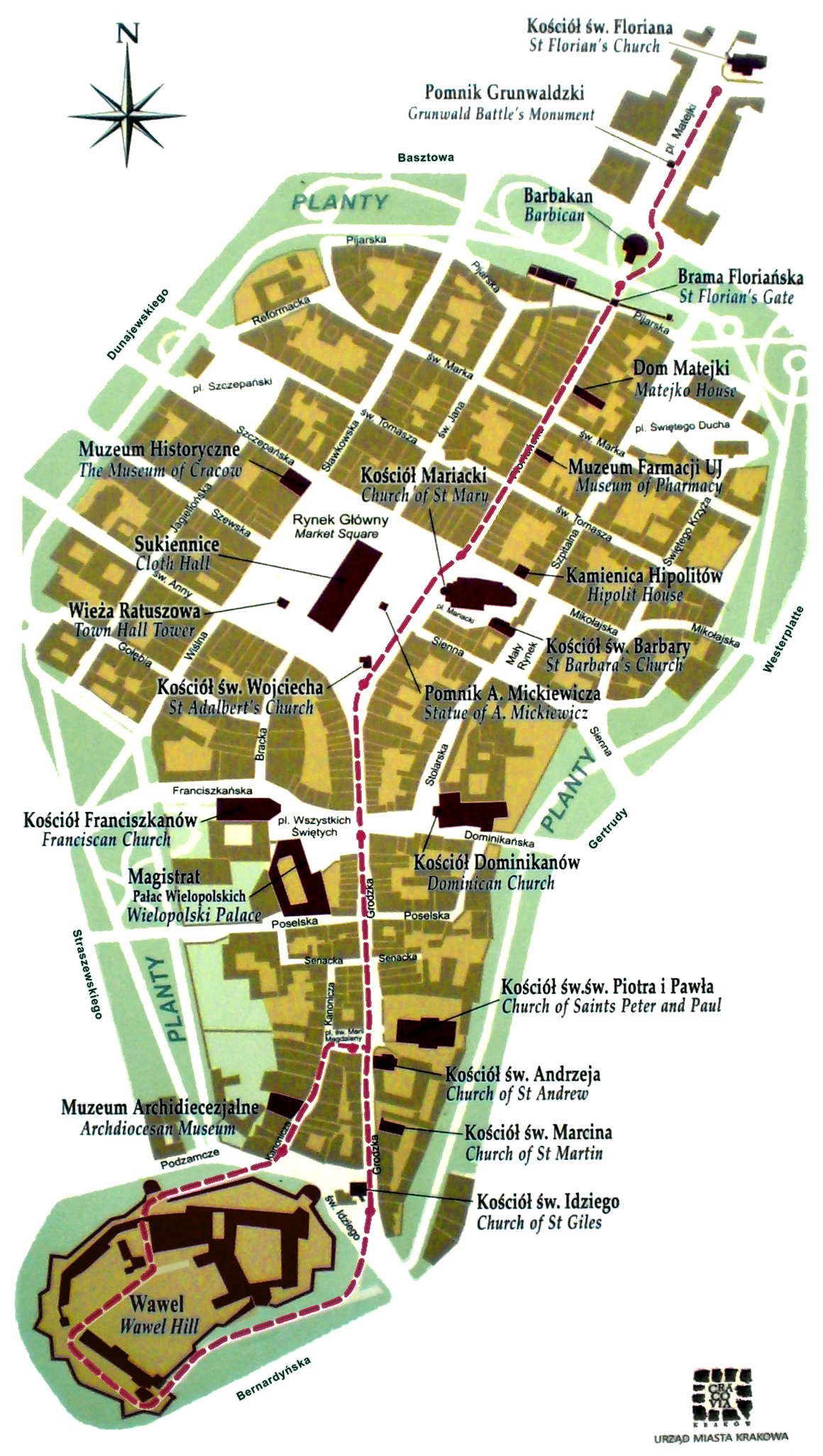
Old Town, Main Market Square in the center

The Main Market Square (Polish: Rynek Główny [ˈrɨnɛɡ ˈɡwuvnɨ], lit. 'Main Market Square') is a historic square in the Old Town of Kraków, Poland.

It is the principal urban space at the centre of the city. It dates back to the 13th century and, with an area of 4 ha (9.9 acres), it is sometimes called one of the largest medieval town squares in Europe.

The Main Market Square is a square space surrounded by historic tenement houses (kamienice) and churches. The centre of the square is dominated by the Cloth Hall (Sukiennice), rebuilt in 1555 in the Renaissance style, topped by a attic or Polish parapet decorated with carved masks. On one side of the cloth hall is the Town Hall Tower (Wieża ratuszowa), on the other the 11th century Church of St. Adalbert and 1898 Adam Mickiewicz Monument. Rising above the square are the Gothic towers of St. Mary's Basilica (Kościół Mariacki). Kraków Main Square does not have a town hall, because it has not survived to the present day.

== History ==
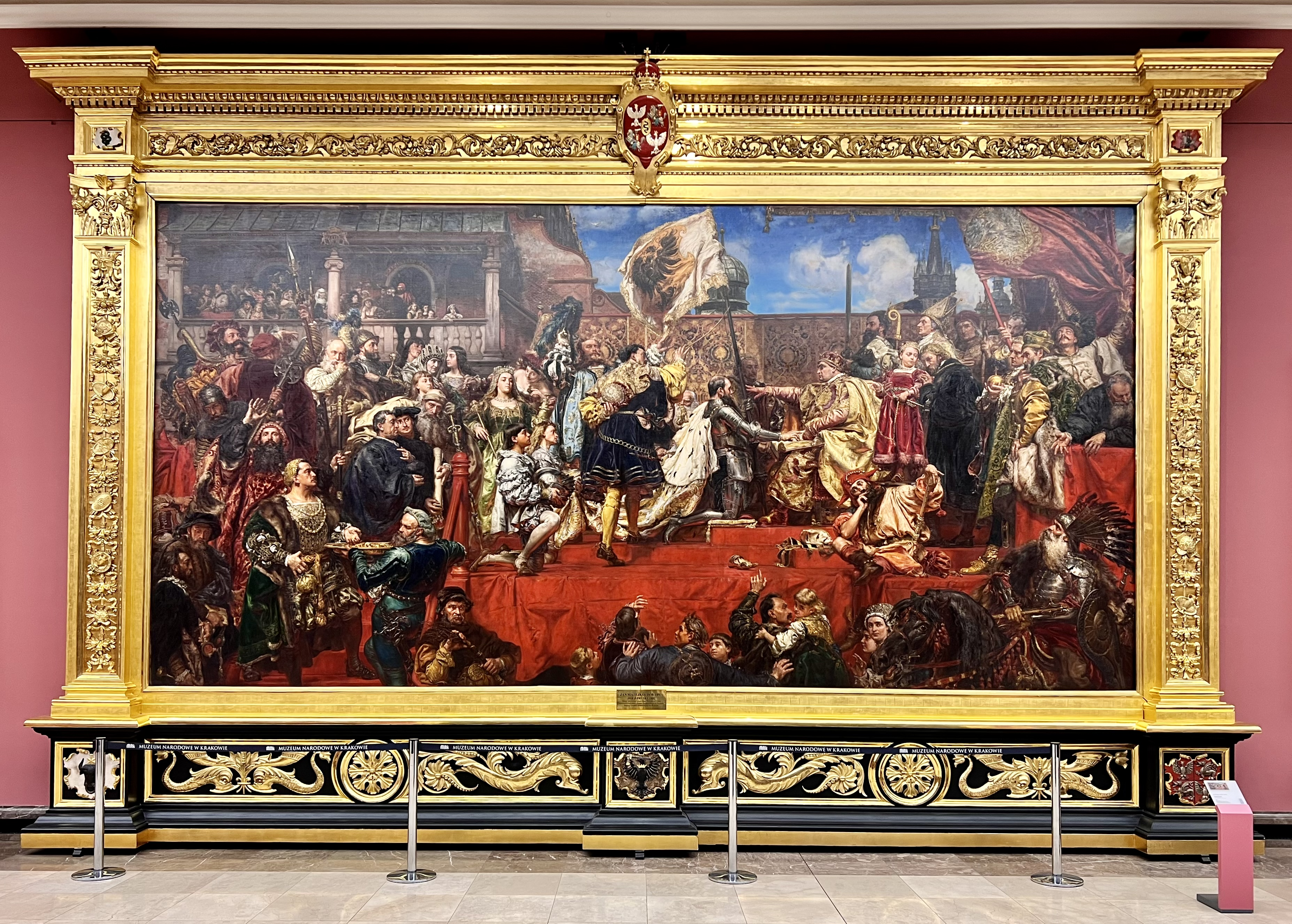
Prussian Homage at the Main Square painted by Jan Matejko, now at the Sukiennice Museum

The main function of the Market Square was commerce. After the city was destroyed by the Mongol invasion in 1241, the Main Square was rebuilt in 1257 and its commercial role expanded with the Magdeburg rights location of the city by the prince of Kraków, Bolesław V the Chaste. The Main Square was designed in its current state with each side repeating a pattern of three, evenly spaced streets set at right angles to the square. The exception is Grodzka Street which is much older and connects the Main Square with the Wawel Castle. Originally the square was filled with low market stalls and administrative buildings and had a ring road running around it. It was King Casimir III the Great who built the original Gothic Cloth Hall and the town hall that filled nearly a quarter of the square. Kraków was the capital of the Kingdom of Poland and a member of the Hanseatic League and the city flourished as an important European metropolis.

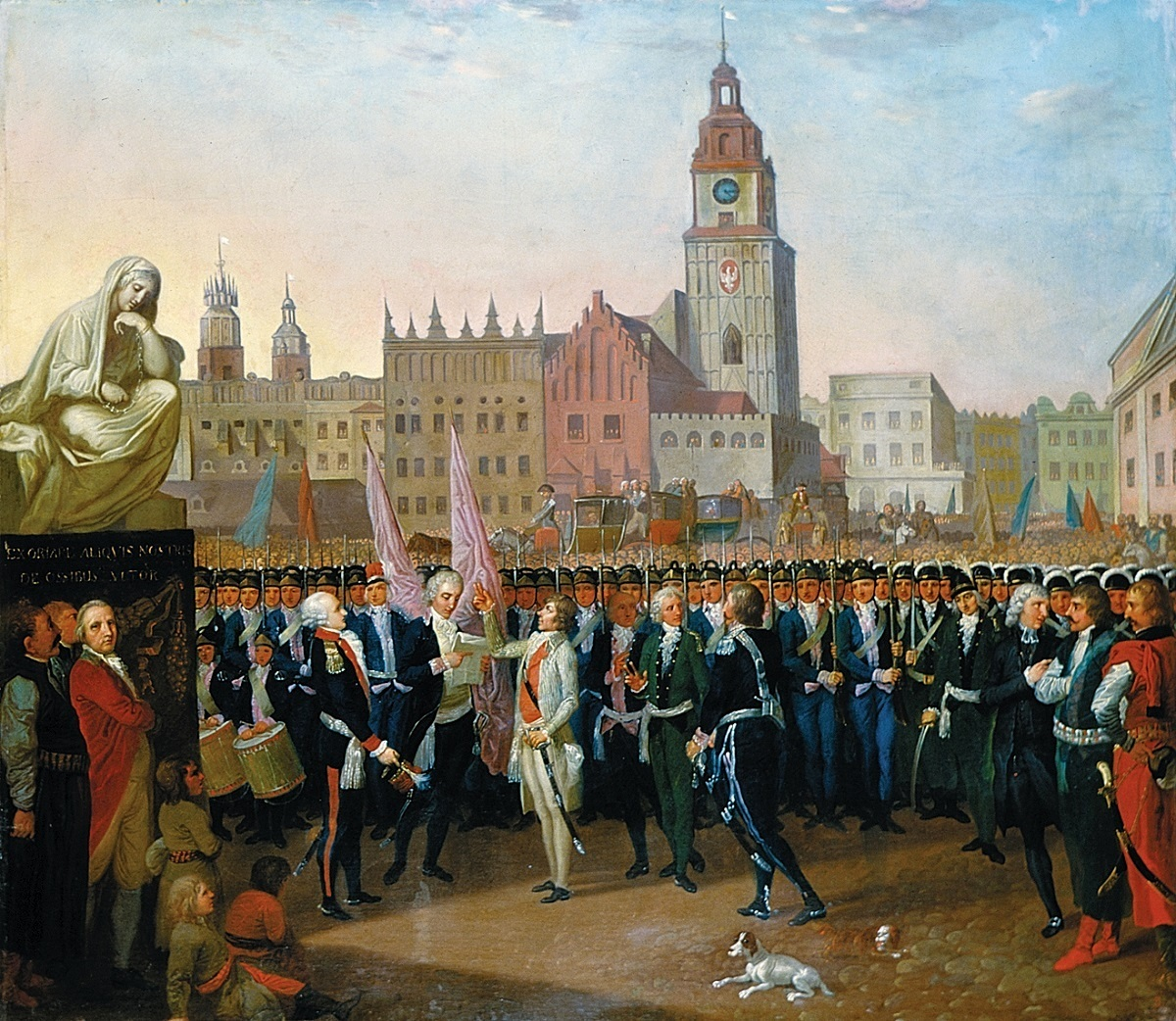
Kościuszko taking the oath at the Rynek. 1797 painting by Franciszek Smuglewicz

In addition to its original merchant functions the Main Square witnessed many historical events, and it was used to stage public executions of prisoners held in the city's Town Hall. It was a place of regal ceremonies as part of the Royal Road (Droga Królewska), frequented by diplomats and dignitaries traveling to Wawel Castle. In 1364 King Casimir held the Pan-European Congress of Kraków there. On 10 April 1525, Albert I, Duke of Prussia paid the Prussian Homage to Sigismund I the Old, King of Poland and Grand Duke of Lithuania, accepting Polish kings' suzerainty, (pictured). In 1514 Lithuanian duke Konstanty Ostrogski held a victory parade over the Muscovy and in 1531 nobleman Jan Tarnowski celebrated another victory in the Muscovite wars. Jan III Sobieski, a King of Poland and Grand Duke of Lithuania, celebrated there his victory over the Turkish Empire in the 1683 Battle of Vienna.

In 1596 King Sigismund III, of the Swedish House of Vasa, moved the capital of the Polish–Lithuanian Commonwealth from Kraków to Warsaw. Kraków remained the place of coronations and royal funerals. On 24 March 1794, at the Main Square Tadeusz Kościuszko announced the general uprising (pictured) and assumed the powers of the Commander in Chief of Polish armed forces, beginning the Kościuszko Uprising. In 1848, in the Spring of Nations, civilians clashed with the Austrian army and it was where, next to Ratusz, Austrian eagles were piled up as a symbol of regained independence in 1918.

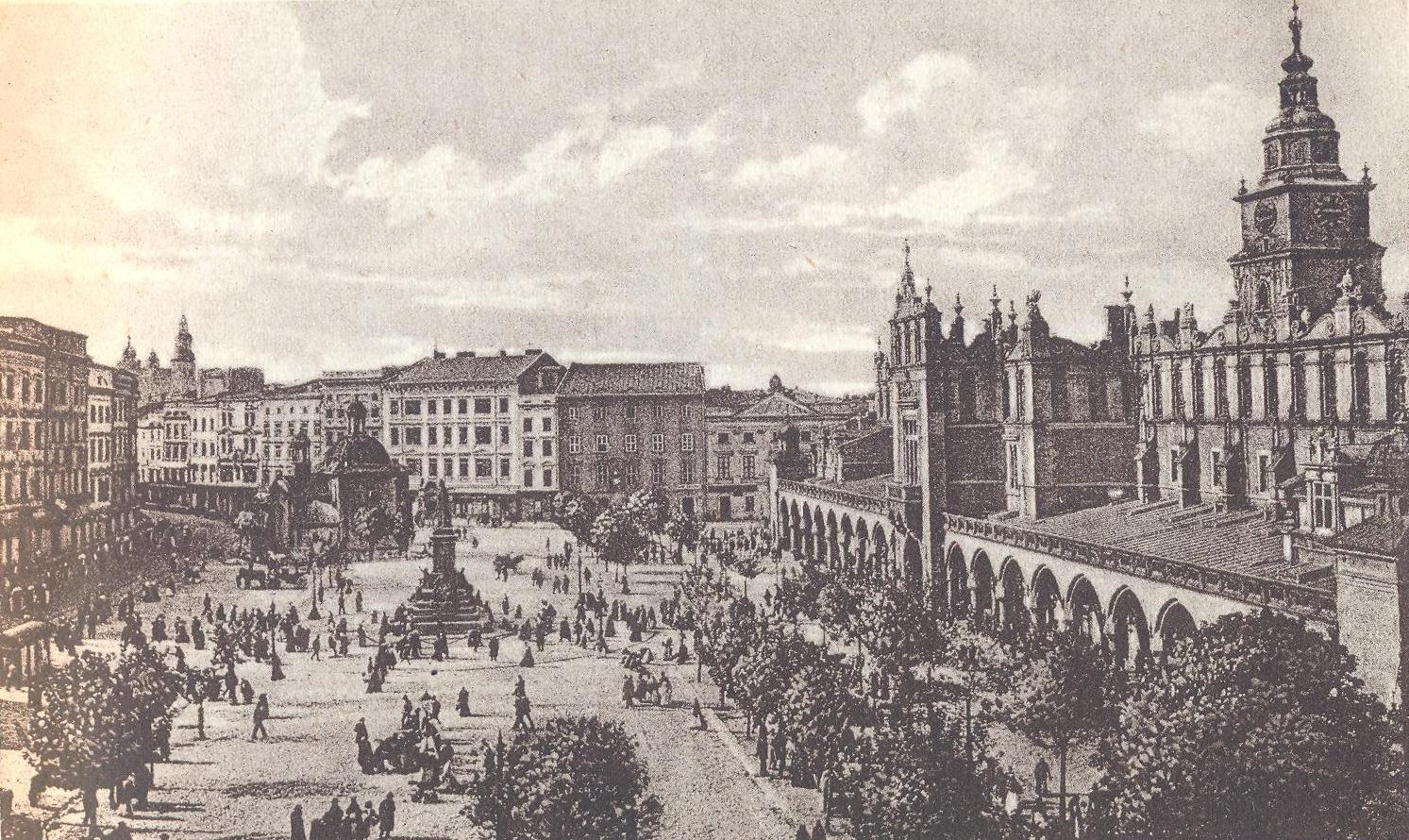
The market square in the 1930s

Jews traded on the square as early as the 15th century. During the occupation of Poland by Nazi Germany, the square was renamed Adolf Hitler-Platz and the Adam Mickiewicz monument was destroyed along with historical commemorative plaques taken from buildings at the square. After the war, the monument was reconstructed.

In 1978 UNESCO placed the Main Square as part of the Old Town Kraków on the list of World Heritage Sites. On 21 March 1980, in a time of political tension and the run-up to the declaration of Martial Law in Poland, Walenty Badylak, a retired baker and a veteran of Poland's wartime underground Home Army, set himself alight chained to a well in the Main Square. Badylak was protesting the communist government's refusal to acknowledge the Katyn war crime. Also, the Main Square was central in staging mass demonstrations of the Solidarity movement. In 2013 Lonely Planet travel guides rated Kraków's Main Market Square as the most beautiful in the world.

== Location ==
The Main Square is located on the Royal Road once traversed during the Royal Coronations at Wawel Cathedral, between the Kraków barbican to the north, and the Wawel Castle to the south. Ever since its creation the square has been considered the centre of the city.

The Main Square is surrounded by old brick buildings (kamienica) and palaces, almost all of them several centuries old. Most buildings have acquired a neoclassical look over time, but the basic structures are older and can be seen in their doorways, architectural details and interiors. Vast medieval cellars of the buildings are used as pubs, restaurants and cabarets. The square is lined with many restaurants and cafes. One of the most renowned, Hawełka at Spiski Palace, was opened in 1876 by Antoni Hawełka, a purveyor to the imperial court in Vienna. The Pod Krzysztofory Palace houses the Historical Museum of Kraków. Among the many tourism-oriented venues there is also the International Centre of Culture. Probably the most famous of the oldest establishments is the Wierzynek's restaurant, remembered for the great feast of 1364 which, according to the legend, lasted for twenty one days and helped to reach a consensus between the monarchs of Europe.

Among the square's landmarks is the cloth hall, which was originally designed in the 14th century as a centre for cloth trade. It was gutted by fire in 1555 and rebuilt in the Renaissance style by Giovani il Mosca from Padua. The arcades were added in the 19th century. The ground floor is continually used for commerce with its many souvenir shops and cafés; upstairs houses the Gallery of the National Museum. Another landmark is St. Mary's Basilica with its Altar by Wit Stwosz, a Brick Gothic church built in the 14th century on the ruins of an earlier church destroyed by the Tartar raids of 1241. In the vicinity of the Market Square one can listen to the heynal, which is played each hour from the highest tower of St. Mary's Basilica. Other landmarks include the Church of St. Adalbert, Town Hall Tower and the Adam Mickiewicz Monument.

Originally the market square consisted of more structures that were crucial to the economy and political life of the city and thus created a microcosm of the city. The Kraków Town Hall existed since the medieval era and was destroyed in the 19th century. Also standing next to the Cloth Hall was the Great Weigh House and the Small Weigh House, which both existed until the 19th century. The foundations of the weigh houses were excavated in the early 21st century and incorporated into an underground museum.

Since its creation, the level of the Market Square has raised, in some places by over 5 metres (16 ft). Underneath there are large basements, the most famous of which is the Piwnica pod Baranami. Many cellars are now transformed into pubs and restaurants; other include the Theater Maszkaron and a small archaeology museum in the basement of the Church of St. Adalbert. There are passages linking some of the basements, such as the one linking the Town Hall Tower with the Cloth Hall. The Hall itself has a little-known underground trading hall, 100 meters wide (328 ft) and 5 meters high (16.4 ft). Near Sienna Street there is another underground hall (Kramy Bogate), with 1,200 square metres (13,000 ft^{2}) of trading area.

== Events ==
In December 2005 the Project for Public Spaces selected Kraków's Rynek Główny as the World's Best Square. It is the focal point of many public events and festivities, such as the annual Kraków szopka Festival, Lajkonik celebrations, Festival of Military Bands, Juwenalia Student Festival, Gala Concert of the Great Orchestra of Christmas Charity and the largest New Year's Eve party in Poland. Every year on Christmas Eve, the Adam Mickiewicz Monument (Mickiewicz' saint's name day) is decorated with flowers by the florists of Kraków.

The culture of Kraków is deeply rooted in colorful traditions with the Main Square remaining most lively and crowded year-round. Like other notable old-town squares, Main Market Square in Kraków is also known for its large population of rock pigeons, florist stalls, gift-shops, beer-gardens and horse-drawn carriages. Fiacres first appeared in the 1830s as rented carriages. Now, they offer tours around the Old Town and to the Wawel Royal Castle.

== Views of the Main Market Square ==
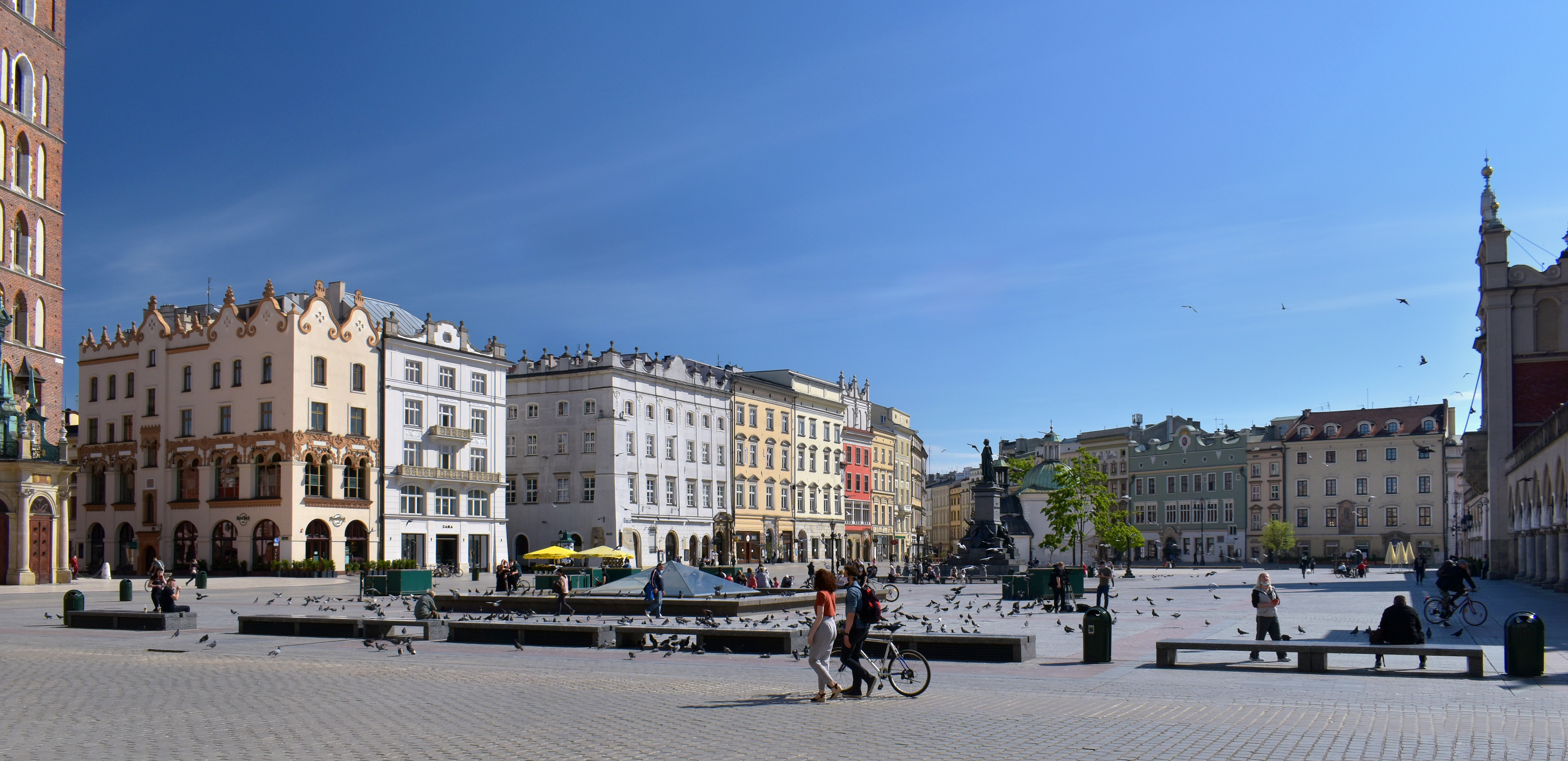
Eastern part of the square.

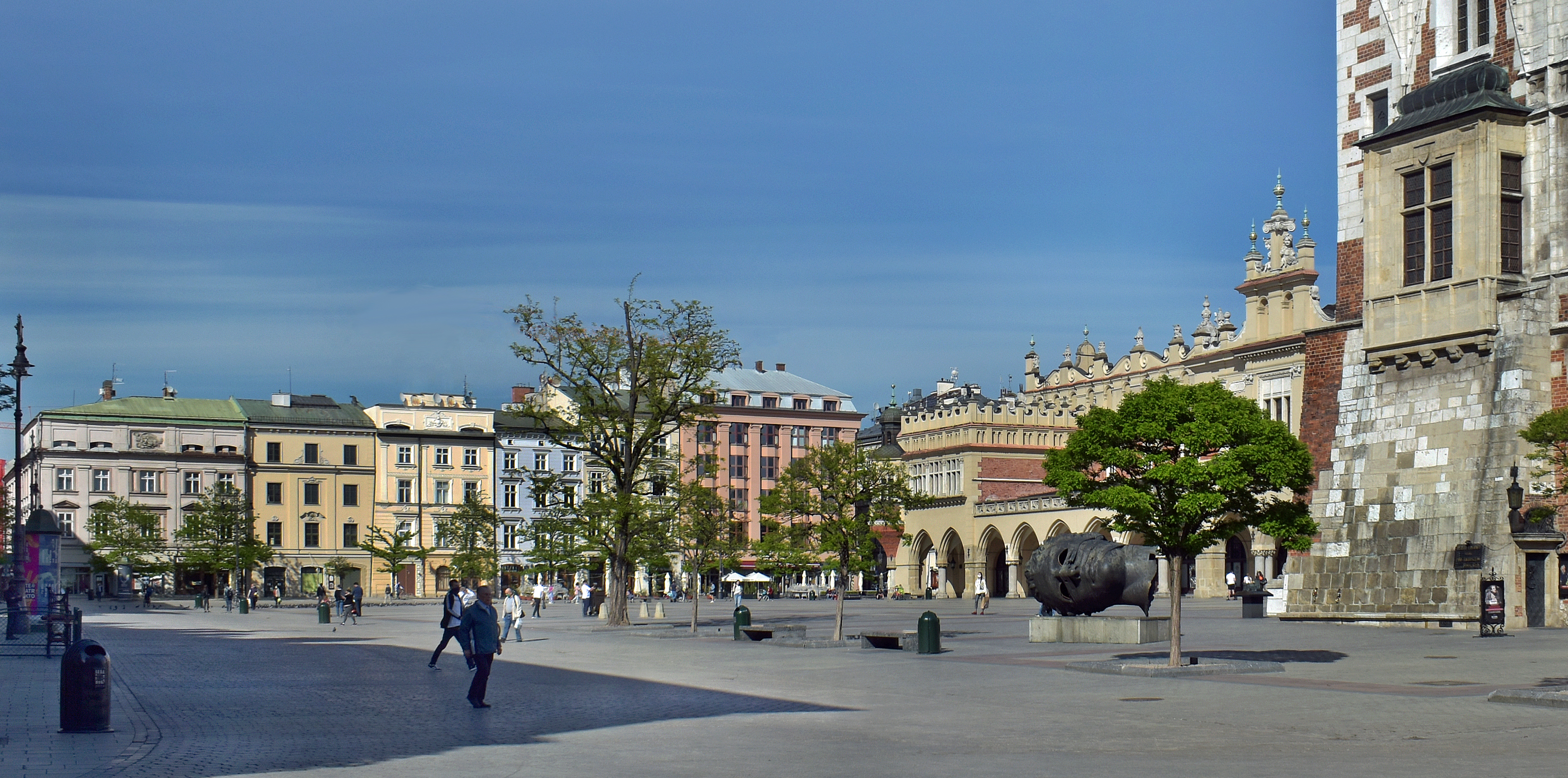
Western part of the square.

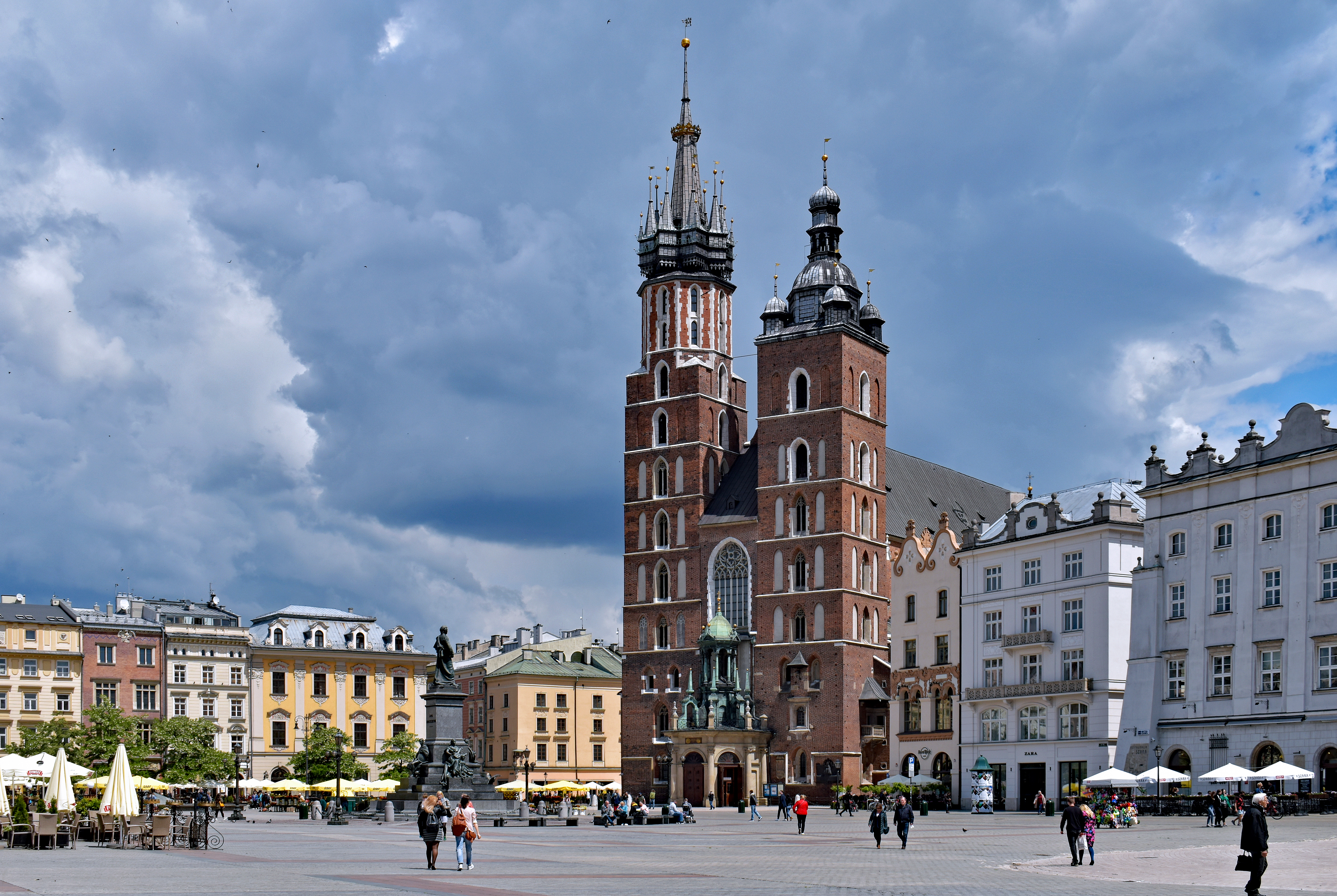
Northeast corner of the square. Adam Mickiewicz Monument and St. Mary's Church.

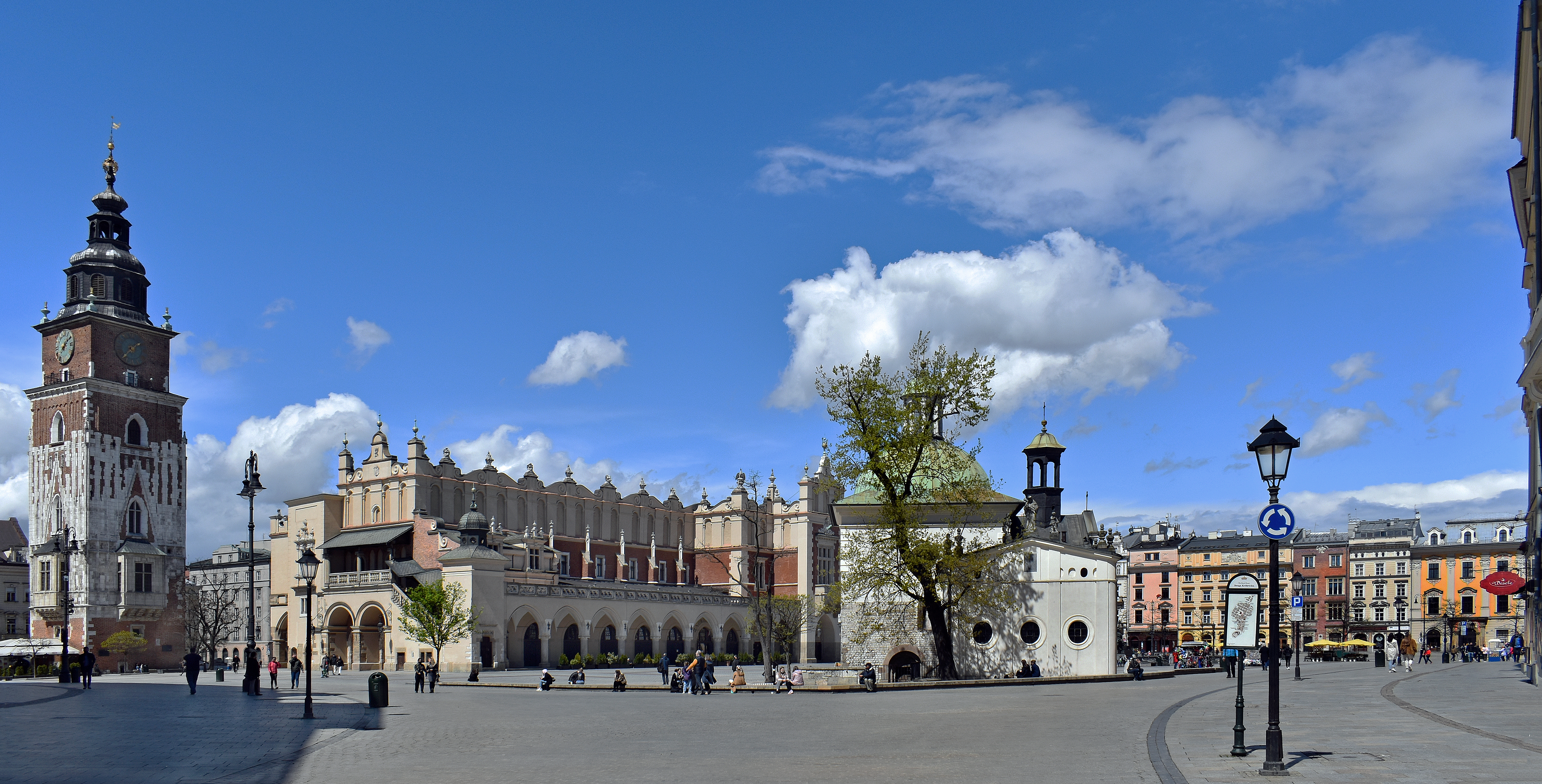
View from the south, from Grodzka Street.

== Buildings on the Main Market Square and more interesting ones around ==
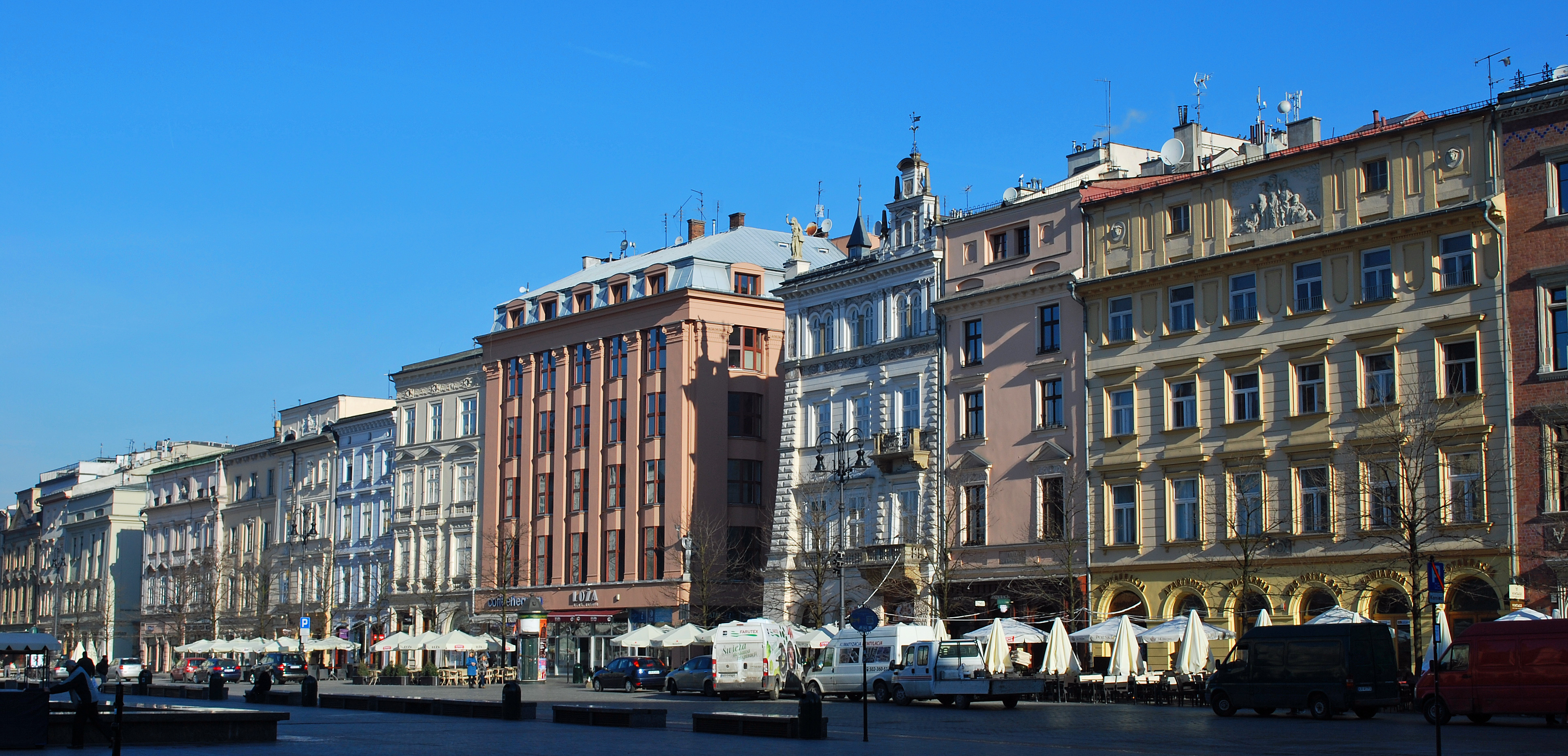
A–B Line (north frontage)

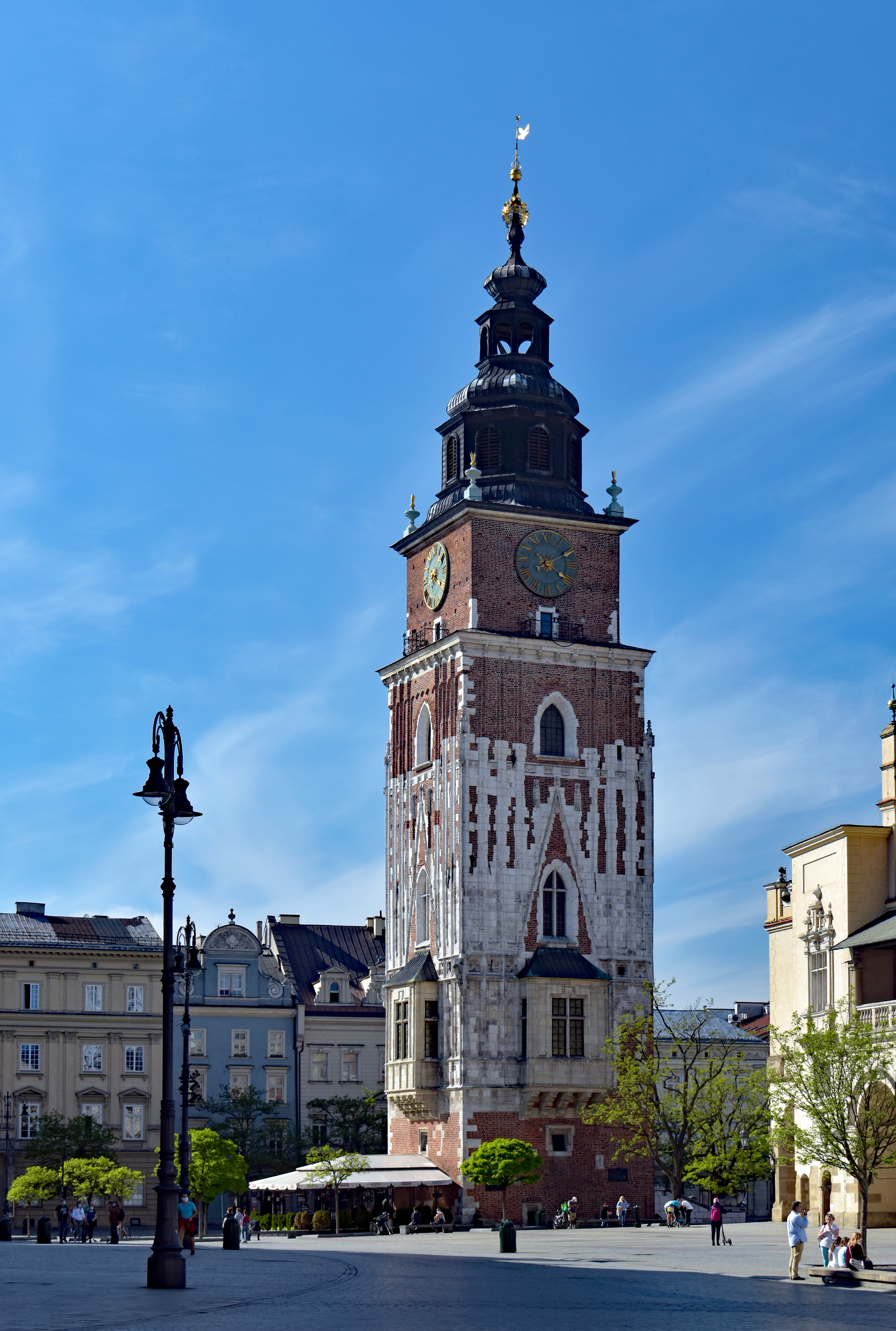
Tower of former Town Hall
1 Main Market Square

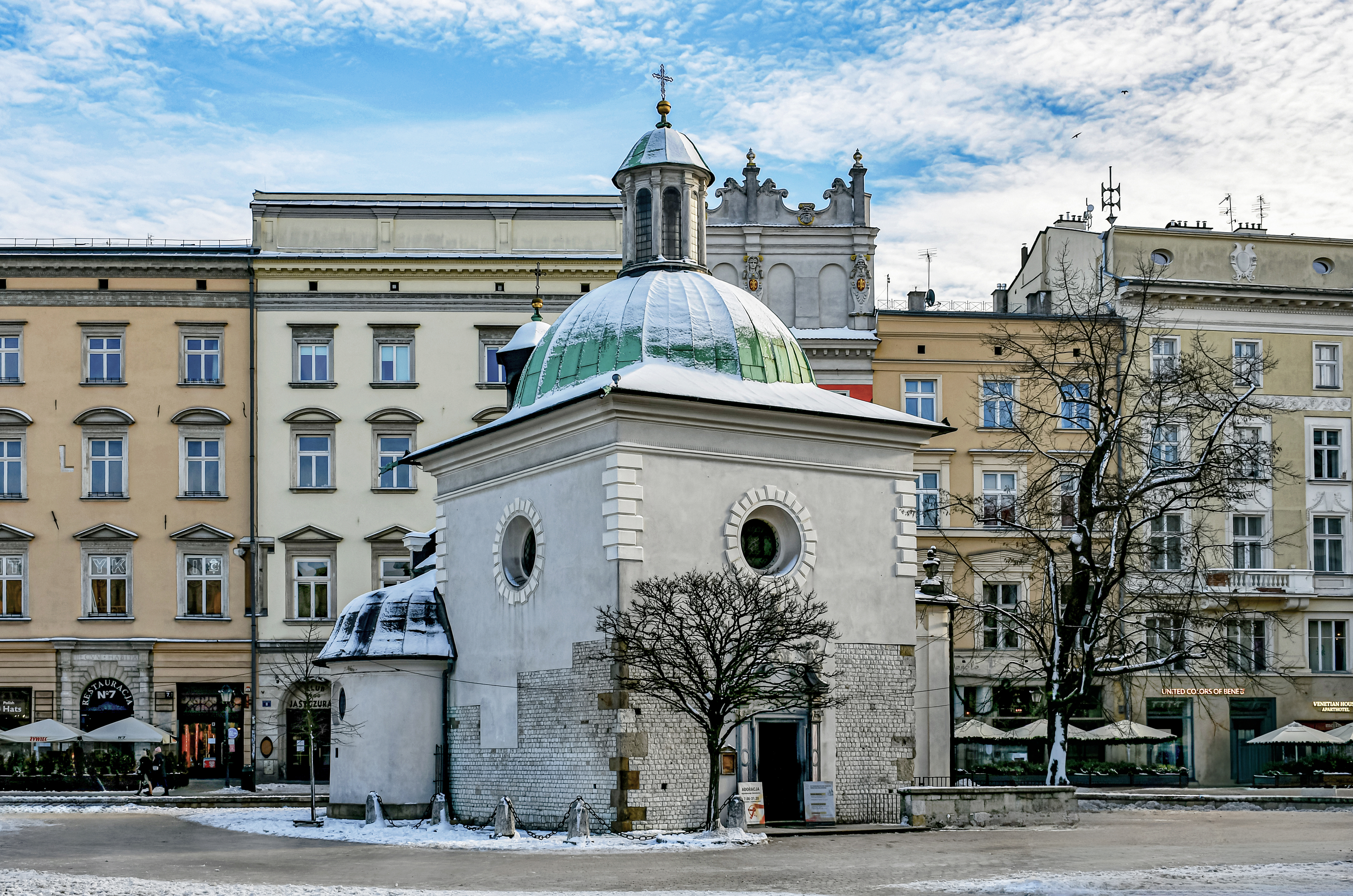
Church of St. Adalbert
2 Main Market Square

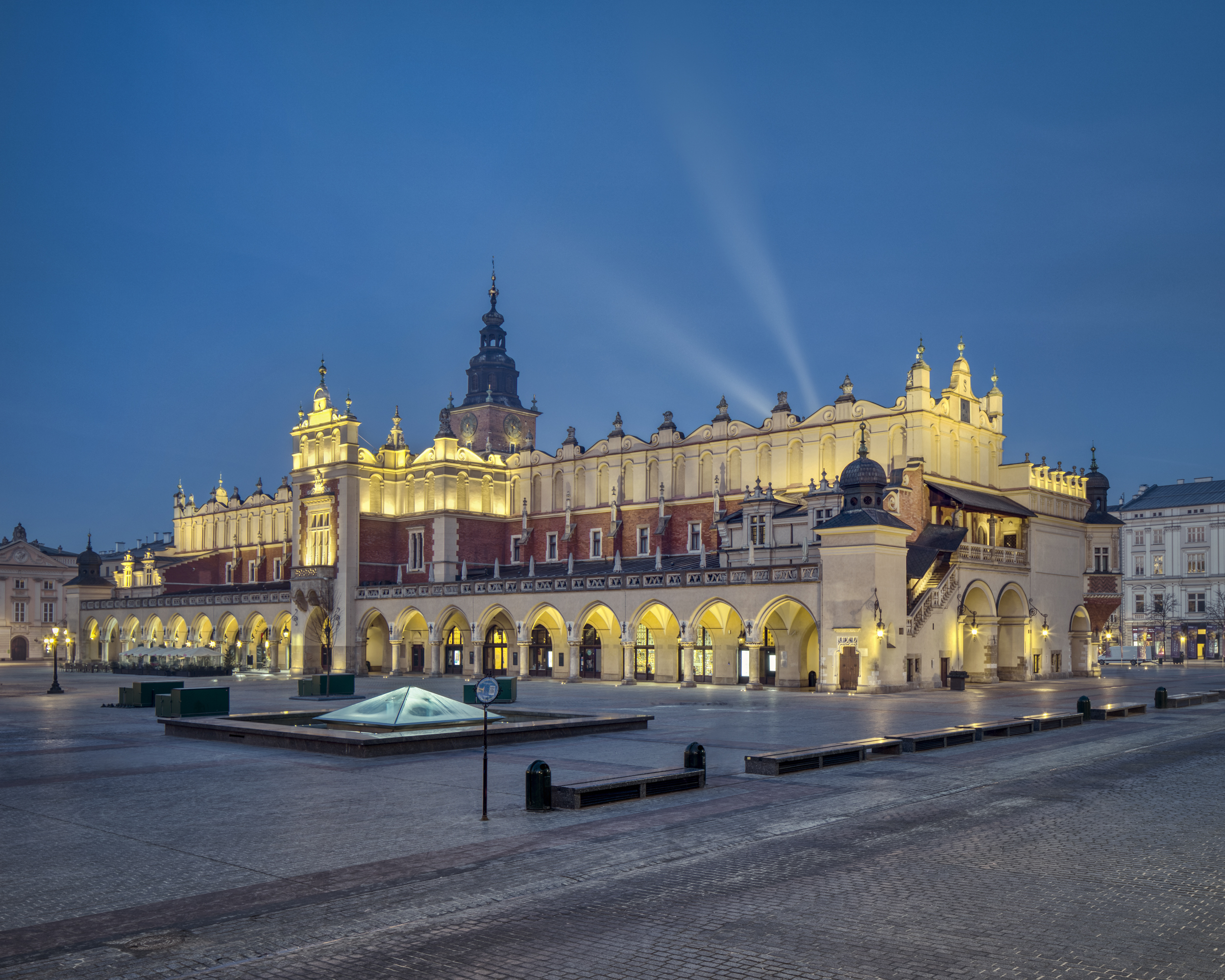
Cloth Hall
3 Main Market Square

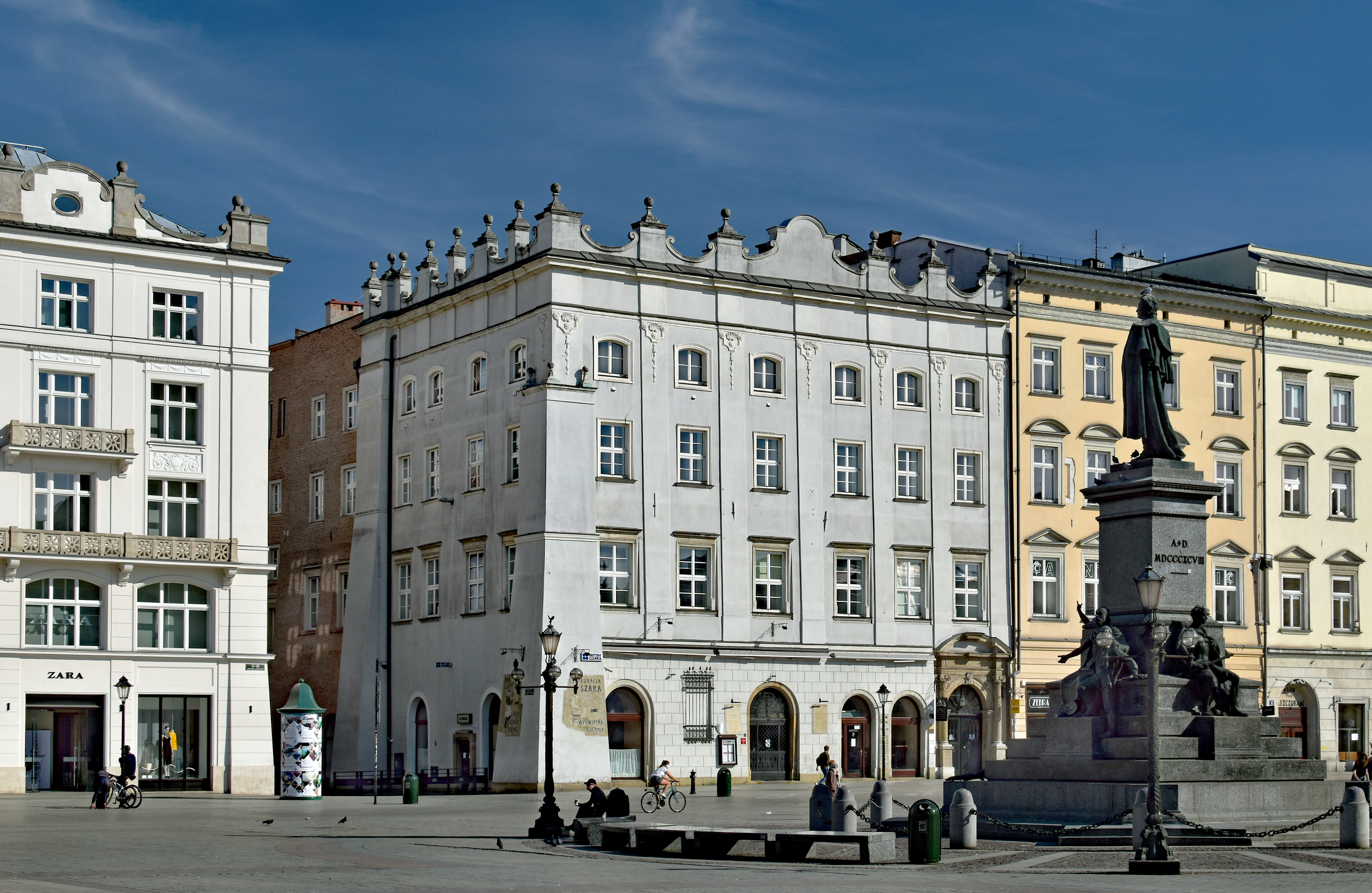
Grey (Szara) House
6 Main Market Square

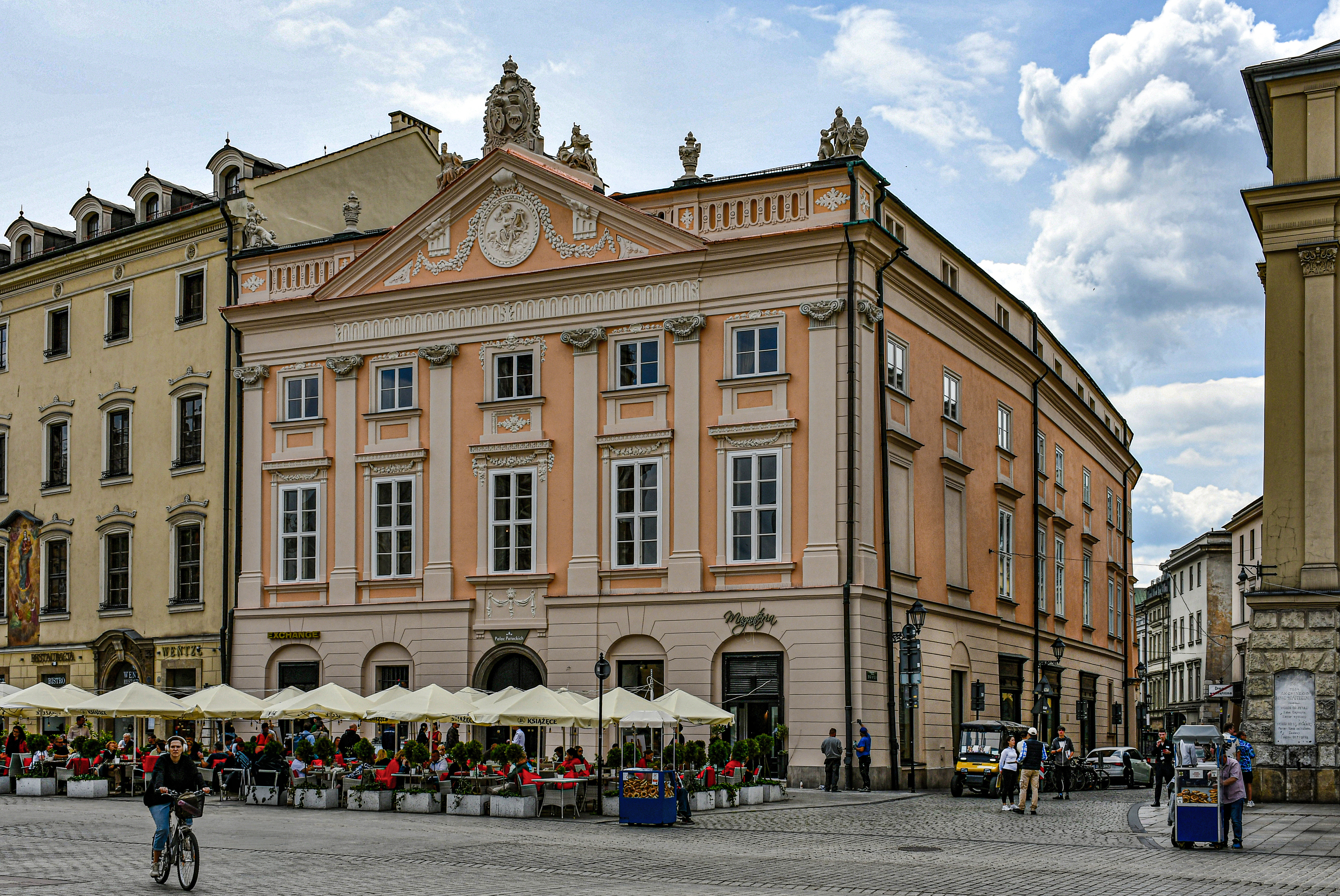
Potocki (Zbaraski) Palace
20 Main Market Square

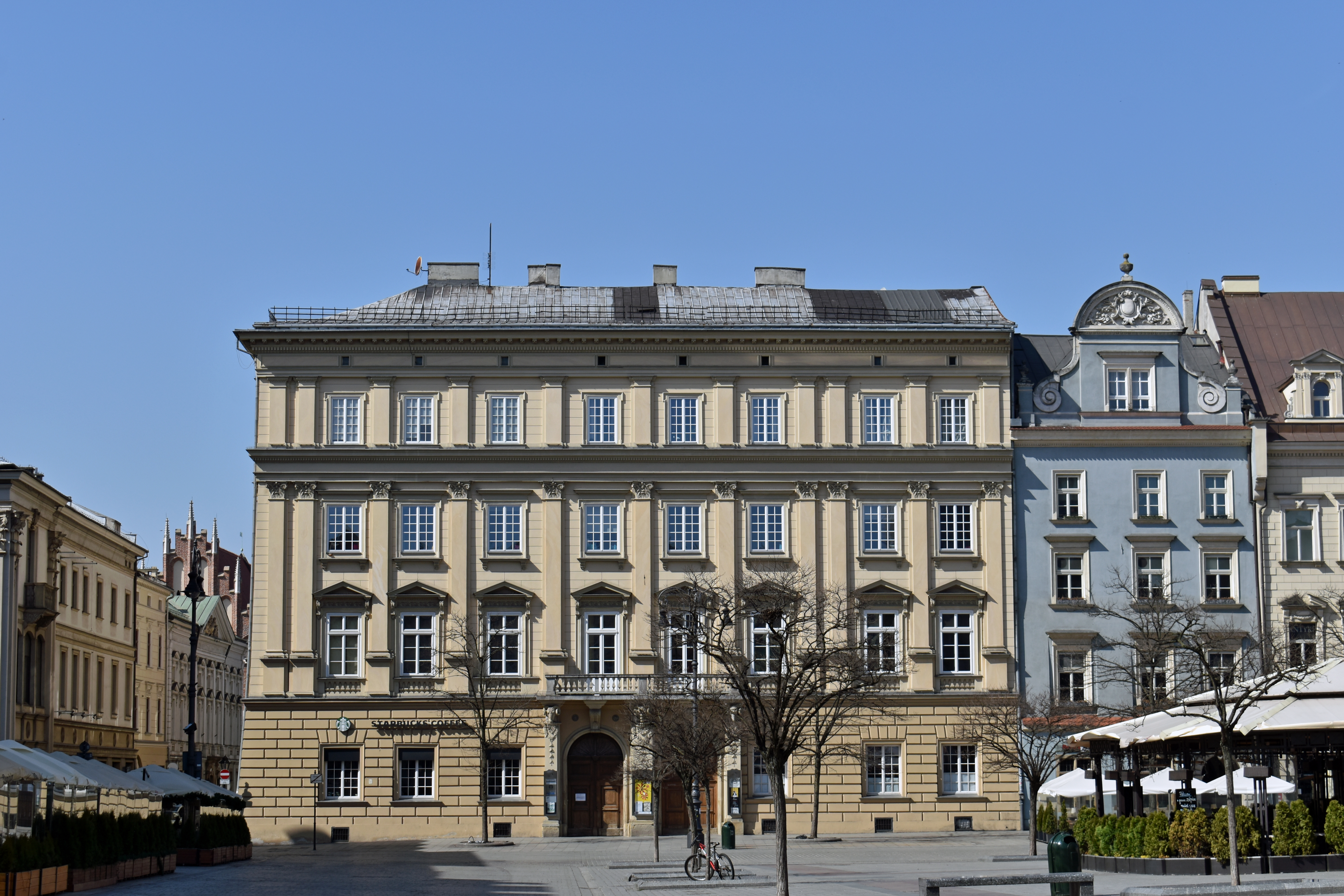
Pod Baranami (Under the Rams) Palace
27 Main Market Square

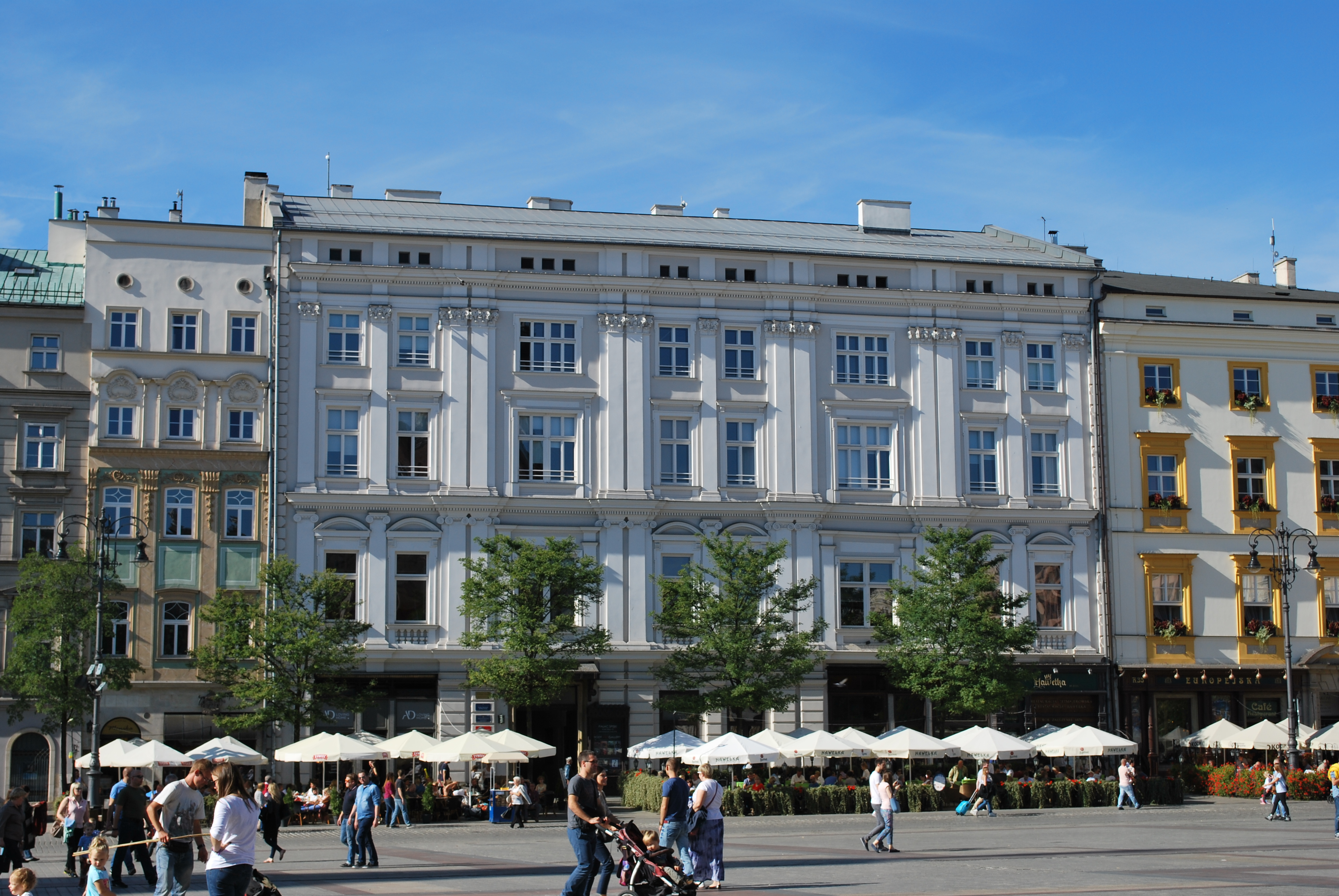
Spiski Palace
34 Main Market Square

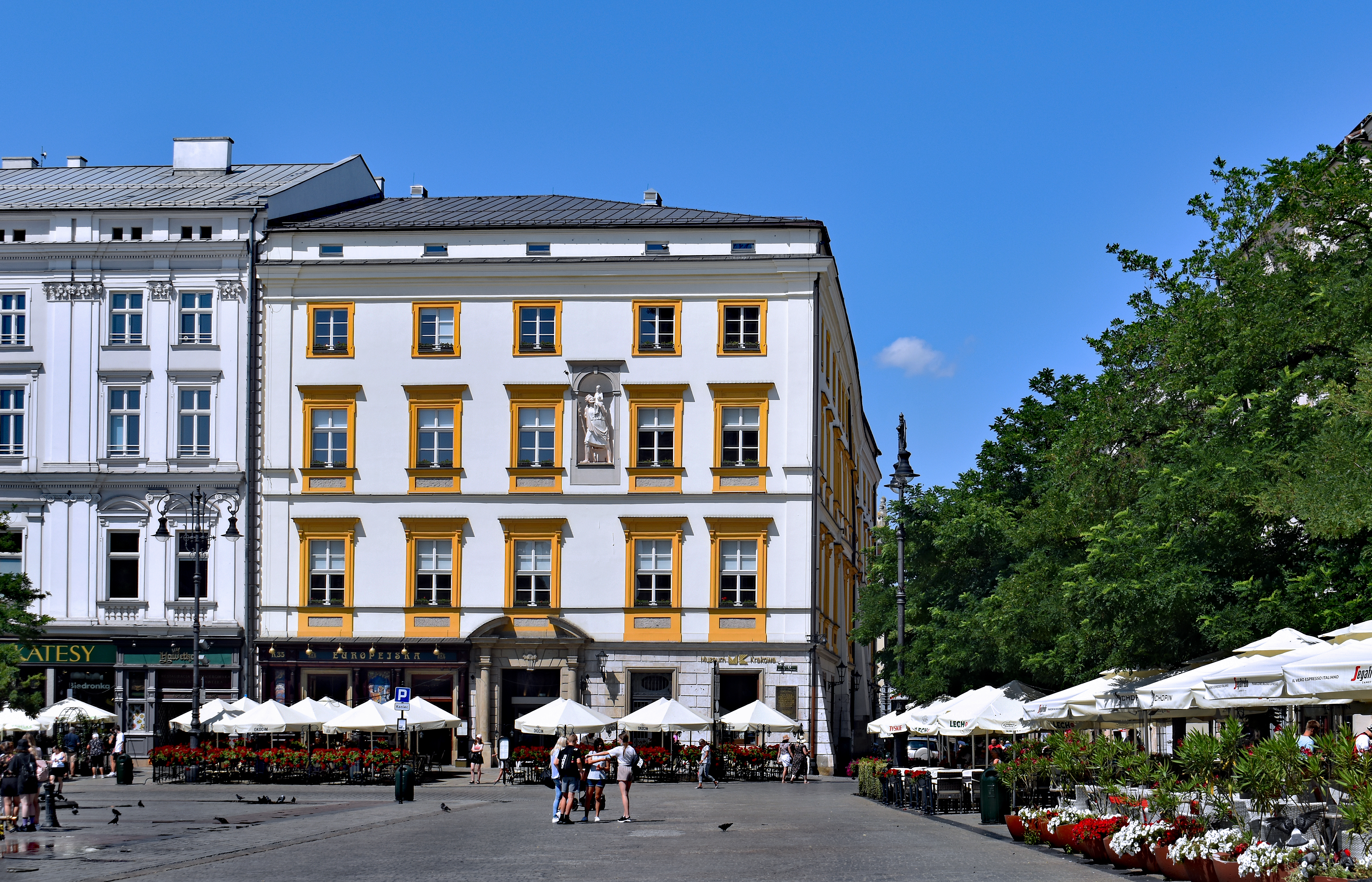
Pod Krzysztofory Palace
35 Main Market Square

== See also ==
- Culture of Kraków
- Culture of medieval Poland
- Events in Kraków
