= Ondřej Havelka =

Czech actor and singer (born 1954)

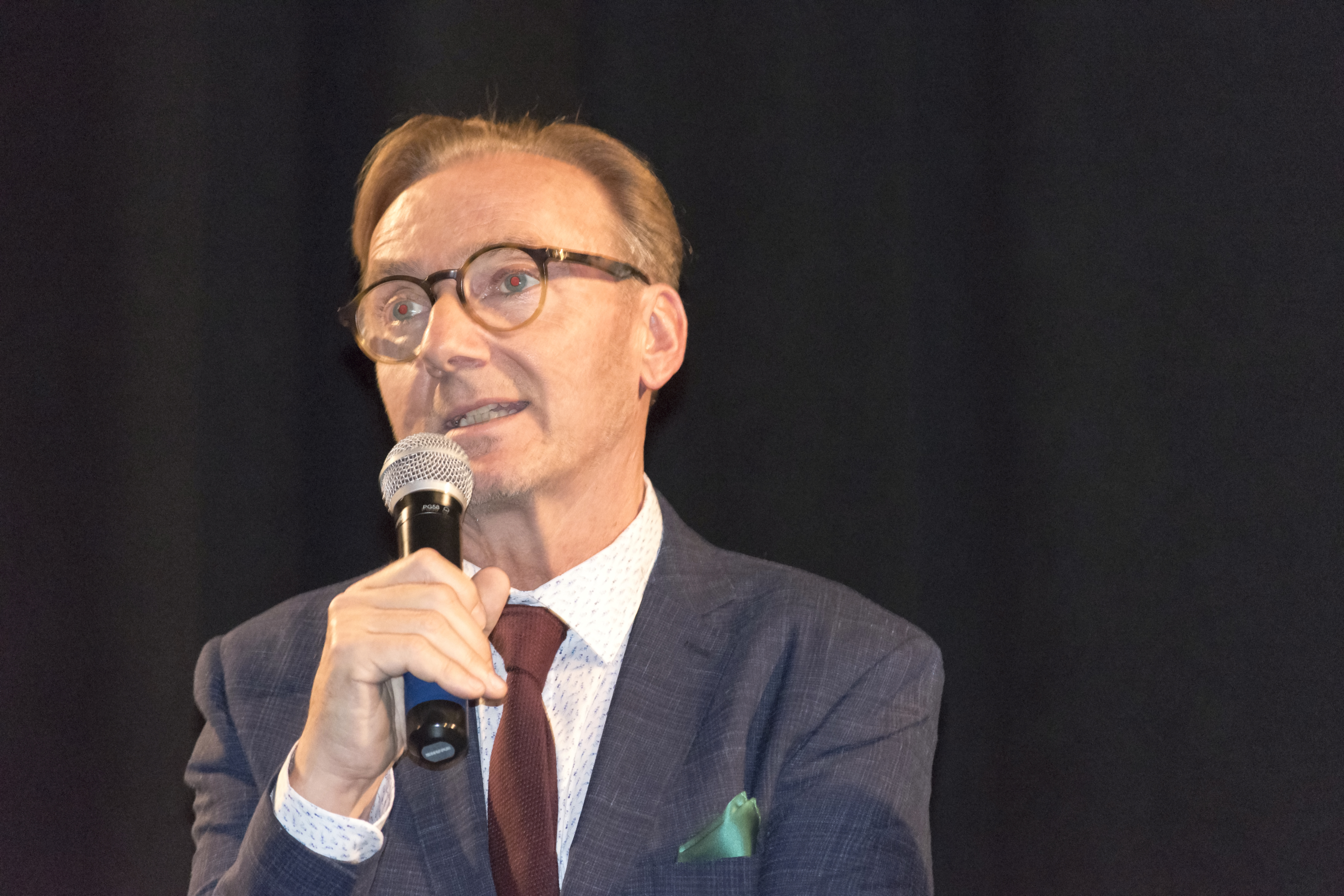
- Havelka in 2018
- Born: 10 October 1954 (age 71); Prague, Czechoslovakia
- Occupations: Actor; musician
- Children: 4
- Parents: Svatopluk Havelka (father); Libuše Havelková (mother)
- Musical career
- Genres: Jazz; swing; blues
- Instrument: vocals
- Member of: Ondřej Havelka a jeho Melody Makers
- Formerly of: Original Prague Syncopated Orchestra

Ondřej Havelka (born 10 October 1954) is a Czech jazz and swing singer, actor, and director. He began his musical career singing with the jazz band Original Prague Syncopated Orchestra in 1976 and went on to form his own group, Ondřej Havelka a jeho Melody Makers, in 1995. He has worked as an actor since the 1970s, and he is the director of several documentary films as well as the 2018 feature Hastrman.

== Early life ==
Ondřej Havelka was born on 10 October 1954 in Prague, Czechoslovakia (present-day Czech Republic). He is the son of actress Libuše Havelková and composer Svatopluk Havelka. After graduating in acting from Prague's DAMU in 1980, he pursued postgraduate studies in opera directing at the Janáček Academy of Performing Arts in Brno, graduating in 1988. Between 1973 and 1983, he also worked at Prague's Studio Ypsilon theatre, and he did a sting at Prague's Karlín Music Theatre.

== Career ==
=== Music ===
Havelka joined the Original Prague Syncopated Orchestra (OPSO) in 1976 as its lead vocalist, releasing five studio albums with the group. He left in 1995 to form his own band in Berlin, the Golden Prague Syncopated Orchestra, taking several members of OPSO with him. The ensemble was later renamed Ondřej Havelka a jeho Melody Makers, and it remains active to this day.

=== Film and television ===
In 1989, Havelka began working as a screenwriter and director in television. In 1990, he wrote the script and directed the music documentary Originální pražský synkopický orchestr, about his former band, which won the "Silver Rose" award at the 1991 Rose d'Or festival. In 1995, he wrote the script for and directed the television documentary Mezzosoprano Magdalena Kožená. In 1999, he wrote, directed, and appeared in the documentary film Zdravý nemocný Vlastimilený Brodský. In 2008, he directed the documentary film Magdalena, once more about Kožená. In 2012, he made the documentary film Perla baroka, about the theatre at Český Krumlov Castle. In 2018, Havelka wrote and directed his first feature film, Hastrman, which starred Karel Dobrý and Simona Zmrzlá.

== Awards ==
In 1995, Havelka won the Gramy award for directing the best music video, for the song "Děkuji, bylo to krásné". A year later, he won once more, this time for best jazz performer.

In 2018, he received an honorary citizenship from the Prague 5 city hall for "lifelong contributions to society", namely, in the field of culture.

== Personal life ==
Havelka has two sons, including actor and musician Vojtěch Havelka (who has played in his father's band) and singer, actress, dancer, and former model Rozálie Havelková.

== Discography ==
=== with Original Prague Syncopated Orchestra ===
- Original Prague Syncopated Orchestra at Breda Jazz Festival (live, 1979)
- Originální Pražský Synkopický Orchestr (1979)
- Stará, Natoč Gramofon (1982)
- Jazz & Hot Dance Music 1923–31 (1984)
- Sám s Děvčetem v Dešti (1989)
- Hello Baby (1994)

=== Solo ===
- Ondřej Havelka uvádí The Swings (1995)

=== with Ondřej Havelka a jeho Melody Makers ===
- Mě to tady nebaví (1998)
- Šťastný nový rok '98 (1998)
- Jen pro ten dnešní den (1999)
- Rhapsody in Blue: Pocta George Gershwinovi (1999)
- Swing It (2000)
- Sing, Sing, Sing featuring Sestry Havelkovy (2001)
- Vzpomínky na hvězdný prach (2002)
- Nejlepší kusy z repertoiru Ondřeje Havelky a jeho Melody Makers (compilation, 2003)
- Tentokrát zcela rozvrkočení (2005)
- Ondřej Havelka a jeho Melody Makers vám přejí veselé vánoce. Bílé a oranžové (2005)
- Rhapsody in Blue Room (2007)
- Saturnin (2010)
- Dávají perly swingu (2012)
- Kríze sem, kríze tam... (2014)
- Nás to tady furt baví (2015)
- Cole Porter with Magdalena Kožená (2017)
- Swing nylonového věku (2021)
- Nebe Na Zemi with Adam Plachetka (2023)

== Selected filmography ==
=== Writer and director ===
- Originální pražský synkopický orchestr (1990)
- Mezzosoprano Magdalena Kožená (1995)
- Zdravý nemocný Vlastimilený Brodský (1999)
- Poslední mohykán (The Last of the Mohicans, 2009) – documentary mapping the life of jazz musician Jiří Traxler
- Magdalena (2008)
- Perla baroka (2012)
- Hastrman (2018)

=== Actor ===
List of appearances, with year, title, and role shown
Year	Title	Role	Notes
1977	Řeknem si to příští léto	Karel	
1980	Koncert na konci léta	Fenix	
1980	Krakonoš a lyžníci	Teacher	
1980–1985	Bakaláři	Various roles	Television series; 4 episodes
1982	Incomplete Eclipse	Eye doctor	
1983	Pod nohama nebe	Petr	
1983	Oblouk světla	Vencl	Television series; 2 episodes
1984	Cesta kolem mé hlavy	Professor Robert Kilián	
1985	Rumburak	Mr. Tumlír	
1986	Není sirotek jako sirotek	Jirka Spěváček	
1986	Chobotnice z druhého patra	Bóda	Television series; 1 episode
1986–1990	Malý televizní kabaret		Television series; 13 episodes
1988	Nefňukej, veverko!	Father's friend	
1988	Panoptikum města pražského	Dr. Souček	Television series; 10 episodes
1989	Dobrodružství kriminalistiky	Alphonse Bertillon	Television series; 1 episode
1991	Kafka	Friend of Kafka	
1994	Saturnin	Jiří Oulický	
1995	Zdravý nemocný Vlastimilený Brodský	Himself	
