= Wierzynek =

Coordinates: 50.0603°N 19.9373°E

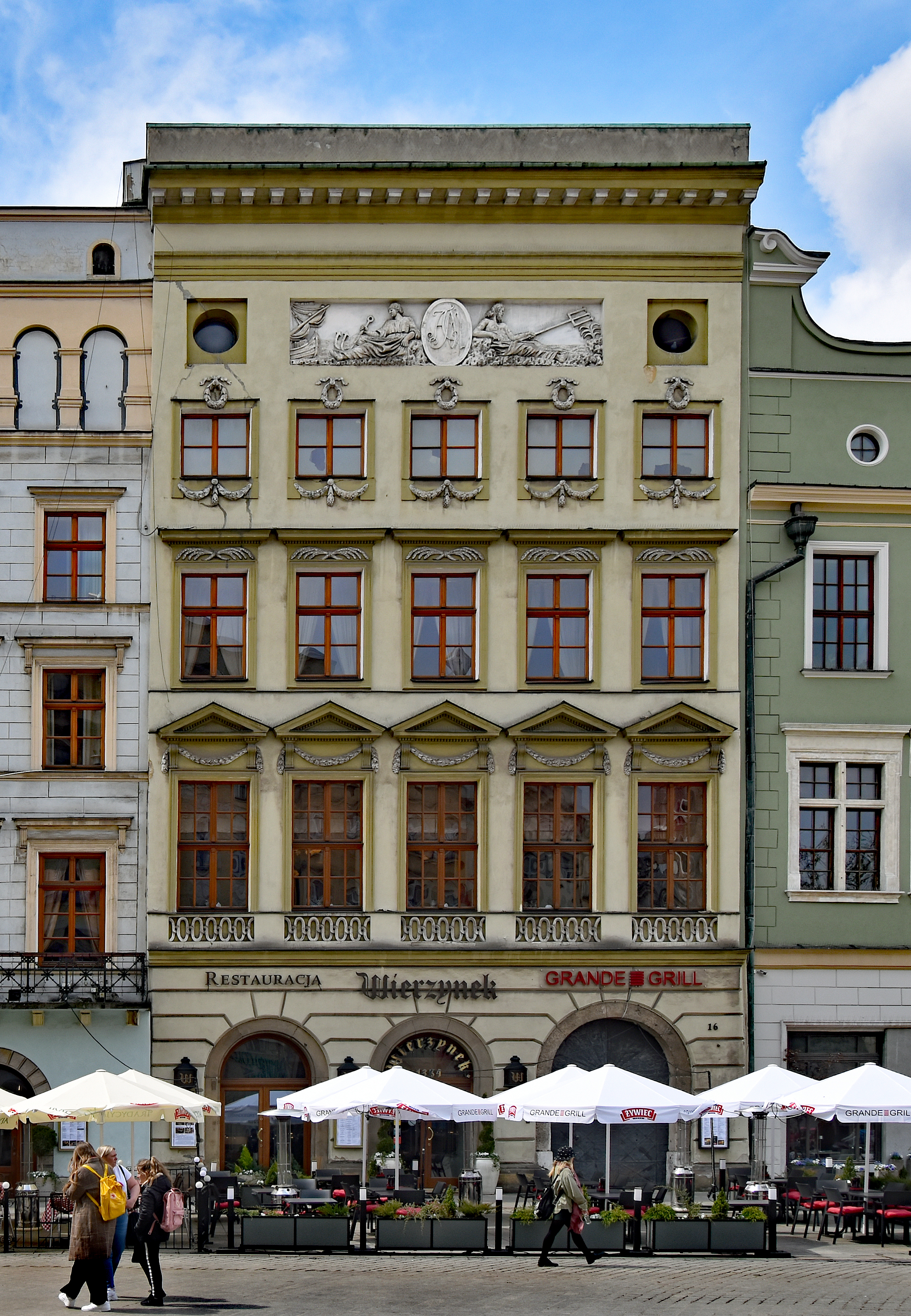
- Interactive map of Wierzynek

Restaurant information
- Location: Poland

Wierzynek is a restaurant located at the Main Square of Kraków Old Town. It occupies four floors and has a capacity of 200 guests. There are eight separate dining rooms including the Italian Pompeii Rooms, the Tatra Room, The Clock Room, the Knights Room and the Chamber of Imagination.

Many world leaders and celebrities have visited the restaurant including Charles de Gaulle, Fidel Castro, Sophie Marceau and Kate Moss.

== See also ==
- Antoni Hawełka
- Café Noworolski
