= Antoni Hawełka =

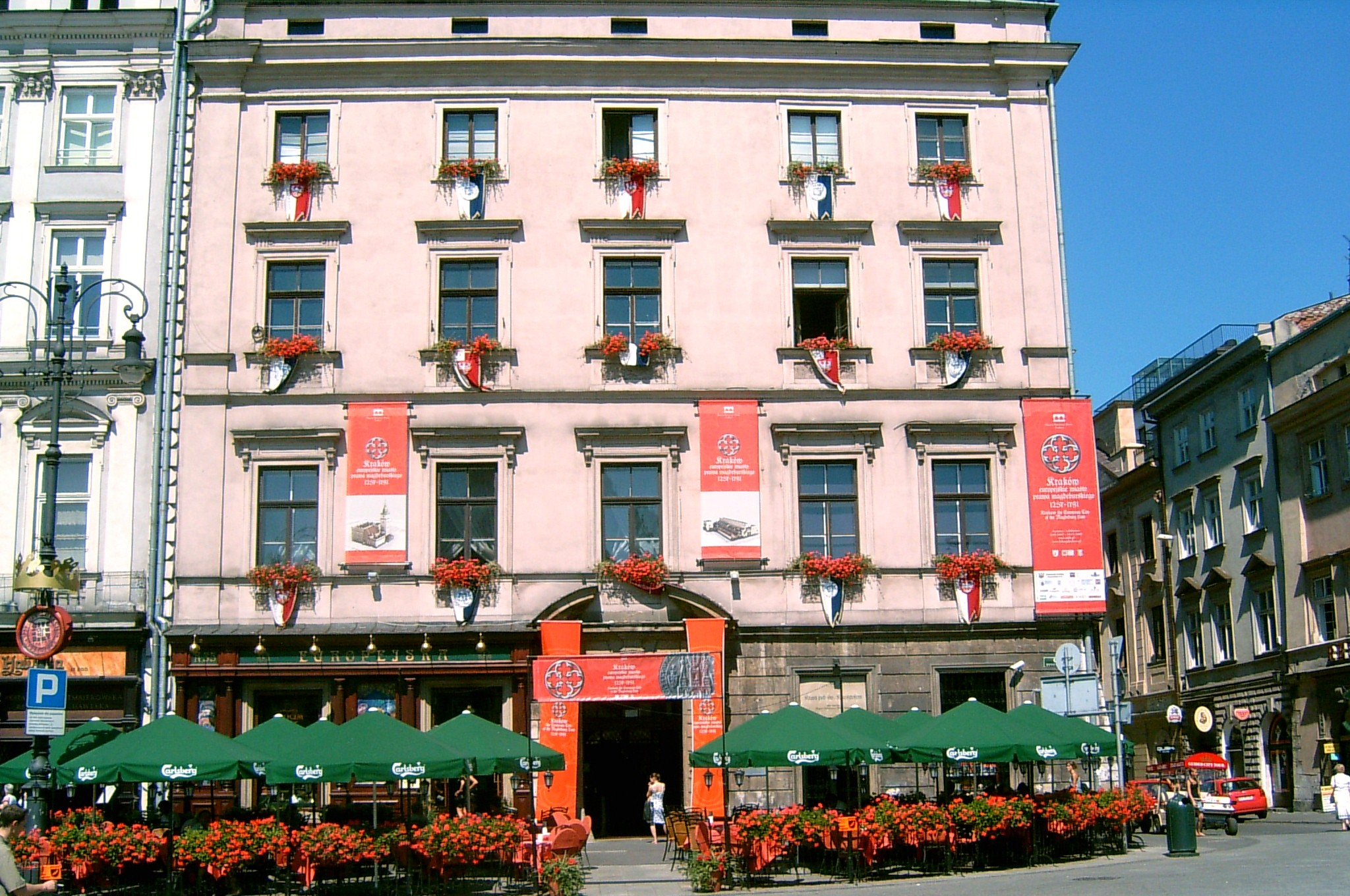
Antoni Hawełka's store Pod Palmą (2007)

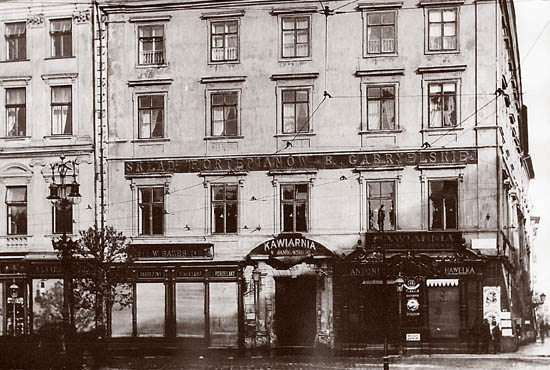
Historical image of Antoni Hawełka's store Pod Palmą

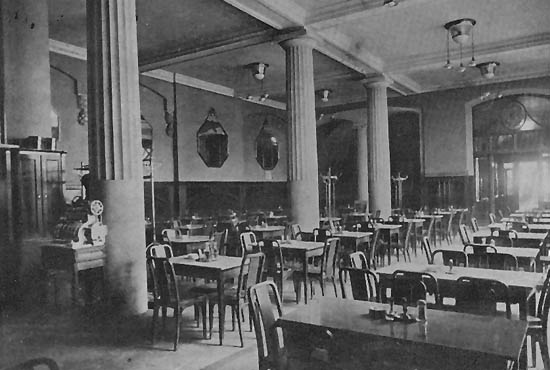
Old interior view of Hawełka

Antoni Hawełka (17 January 1840 – 14 January 1894) was a Polish merchant and caterer, born in Kęty.

== Biography ==
Hawełka was the founder of a well-known restaurant Pod Palmą (Under the Palm) on the Main Market Square in Kraków. He opened a colonial store first in 1876, at Rynek 46, and then moved to Krzysztofory Palace at Rynek 35 in order to expand his business, and added a restaurant to his already popular venue. Hawełka traded in the region, and outside of it as well. For his services he was given an imperial warrant and became a purveyor to the imperial court in Vienna.

He also donated money to the renovation of the Chapel of St. Anthony in St. Mary's Basilica, Kraków. A memorial plaque was placed on the right side of the altar.

He was laid to rest in Rakowicki Cemetery.

== See also ==
- Café Noworolski
- Jama Michalika
- Wierzynek
