= Svatopluk Havelka =

Czech composer (1925–2009)

Svatopluk Havelka (born 2 May 1925 – 24 February 2009) was a Czech composer.

== Biography ==
Svatopluk Havelka was born in the village of Vrbice in the North Moravian region of Czechoslovakia. He studied composition privately with Karel Boleslav Jirák from 1945 to 1947, while a student of musicology at the Faculty of Philosophy of Charles University under Josef Hutter and Antonín Sychra. Havelka subsequently became a member of the music department of Czechoslovak Radio in Ostrava. At the same time he was the founder and artistic director of the NOTA Ensemble (1949–1950). For the next four years he was an instructor and composer with the Army Art Ensemble. Beginning in 1954 he devoted himself to freelance composing. He was especially prolific as a film composer, providing music for more than 200 films, including several from the Czech "New Wave" in the 1960s. His early style was marked by traits of the folk music of his native Moravia, but he later turned to more complex techniques, particularly in the large-scale orchestral and choral works he composed in the 1960s and 70s. Beginning in the late 1970s his attention became focused on Christian subjects, and he composed many biblically based chamber works and choral-orchestral pieces. His wife was the actress Libuše Havelková, with whom he had a son, musician and actor Ondřej Havelka. Havelka died on 24 February 2009 in Prague.

== Selected list of works ==
- The Rose of Wounds. Songs for a middle voice and piano (also for orchestra) to texts by Baroque poets, 1944, CHF, o PA 8'
- Night Music for orchestra, 1944, manuscript 20'
- Suite for Small Orchestra, 1947, manuscript 16'
- Symphony No. 1, 1956, SU, o Su 42'
- Four Music-dramatic Suites to texts of Moravian folk poetry for solo voice, chamber ensemble, reciter, voiceband and chamber orchestra - 1948, 1949, 1951 - manuscript each 30'
- Spring. Vocal Rhapsody for three solo voices, mixed and children's choir, large orchestra, 1949 - CHF 25'
- In Praise of Light. Cantata for soprano, alto, bass, mixed choir and large orchestra to words from S.K. Neumann's Sonata of Horizontal Life - 1959, P o Su 50'
- Heptameron. A poem on nature and love for soprano, alto, tenor, and bass, reciter and orchestra - 1964, PA, o Su 45'
- Foam. A Symphonic Poem on the poem of the same title by Hans Magnus Enzensberger - 1965 - PA, o Su 12'
- Ernesto Che Guevara. Symphonic Picture - 1969, P, CHF 14' o P
- Pyrrhos. Symphony- ballet, 1970, Su 28'
- Hommage a Hieronymus Bosch. Symphonic Fantasy for orchestra - 1974, P o P 12'
- Nonet 1976, ESu, o Su 20'
- Percussionata. A suite for percussion instruments, 1978, ESu, o Su 20'
- Children's Suite for orchestra, 1982 (from the film music "Johnnie's Journey")
- CHF 23'
- Poggii Florentini ad Leonardum Aretinum epistola de M. Hieronymi de Praga supplicio (Epistle of Poggio Bracciolini of Florence to Leonardo Bruni of Arezzo on the Condemnation of Master Jerome of Prague). Oratorio for 4 soli (S, A, T, B), children's choir, madrigal choir, mixed choir, large symphony orchestra and organ - 1984, P, o P, CD P 68'
- Tichá radost (Quiet Joy), composition for solo viola, 1985, CHF 17'
- Disegno. Composition for solo flute, 1986, CHF 14'
- Homage to Fra Angelica for guitar, 1987, o P 11'
- Profeteia. Composition for children's choir, orchestra and organ (ad lib.) to Biblical texts - 1988, CD P 24'
- Soliloquia abimae ad Deum (Dialogues between the Soul and the Lord) for clarinet and piano - 1991, 27' o CD P
- The Hidden Manna and a White Stone. For two percussion players - 1992 13' CD P
- Pareneze for soprano, piano and 2 percussionists, 1993, CD PA 24'
- ....with sounding cymbals (Psalm 150). For percussion solo - 1994 CD P 17'
- The Signs of the Times. For the Symphonic Orchestra. Written for the 100th anniversary of the Czech Philharmonic Orchestra (1996) 27'
