= Libuše Havelková =

Czech actress (1924–2017)

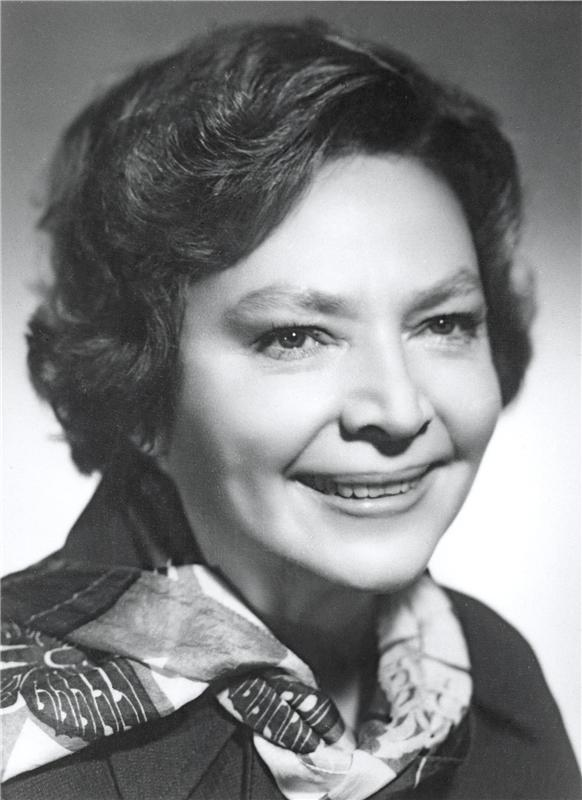
- Born: 11 May 1924; České Budějovice, Czechoslovakia
- Died: 6 April 2017 (aged 92); Prague, Czechia
- Occupation: Actress
- Years active: 1957–2012

Libuše Havelková (11 May 1924 – 6 April 2017) was a Czech actress. She appeared in more than 90 films and television shows between 1957 and 2012. She was married to composer Svatopluk Havelka, with whom she had a son, musician and actor Ondřej Havelka.

== Selected filmography ==
- September Nights (1957)
- Closely Watched Trains (1966)
- Rosy Dreams (1977)
- Jako kníže Rohan (1983)
- Babičky dobíjejte přesně! (1984)
