= 5 Garncarska Street tenement =

5 Garncarska
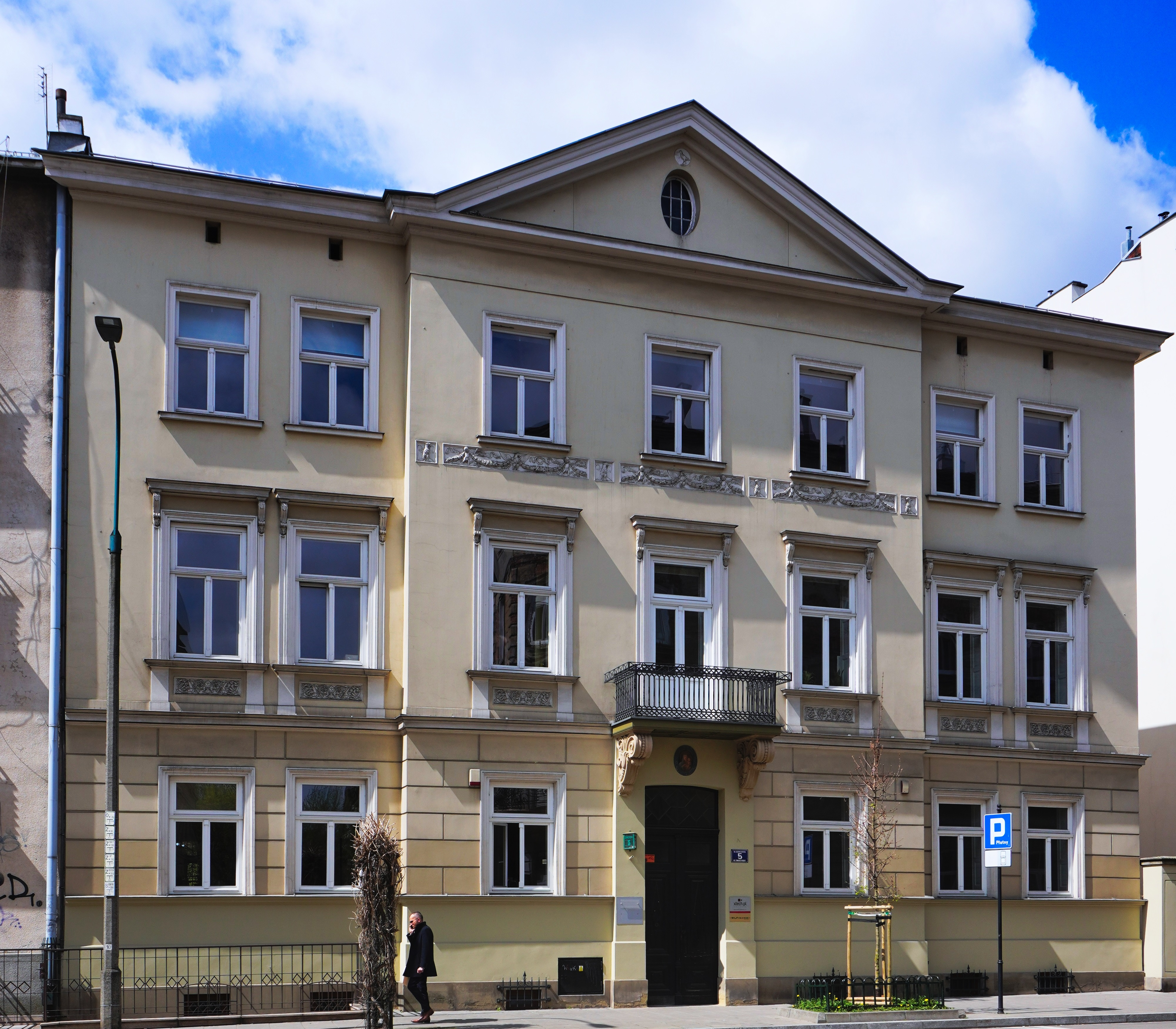

General information
- Address: 5 Garncarska Street
- Town or city: Kraków
- Country: Poland
- Coordinates: 50°03′46.6″N 19°55′39.0″E
- Completed: 1893

5 Garncarska is a tenement house located at 5 Garncarska Street in Kraków in the District I Old Town, in the Piasek neighborhood.

== History ==
The building was constructed in 1893. In 1908, its rear outbuilding were reconstructed. In 1931, a second floor was added to the building according to a design by Franciszek Mączyński and Tadeusz Stryjeński.

On February 10, 1995, the tenement was entered into the Registry of Cultural Property. It is also entered into the municipal register of monuments of the Lesser Poland Voivodeship.

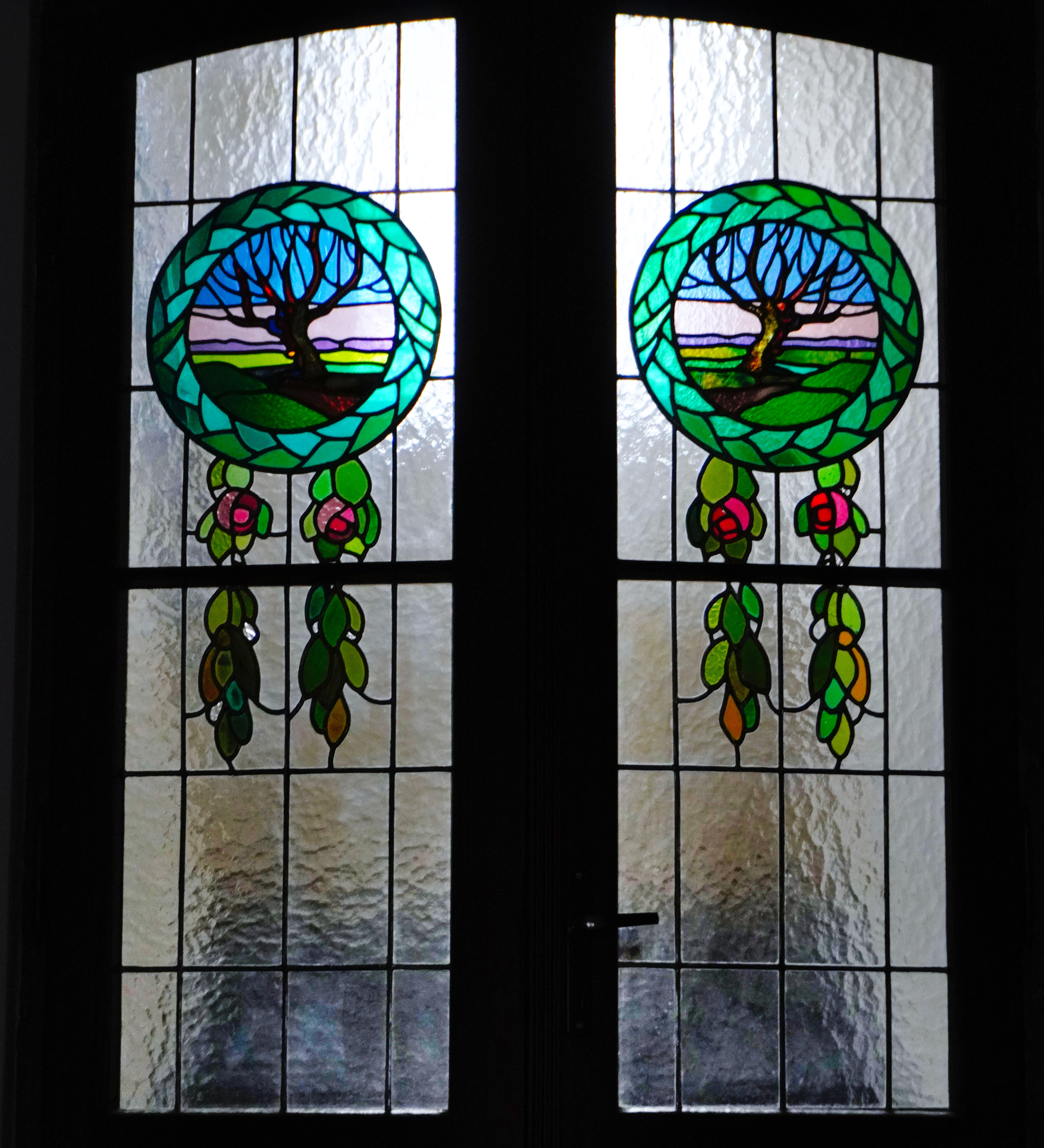
Stained glass in the door to the staircase
