= Karol Zaremba =

Polish architect

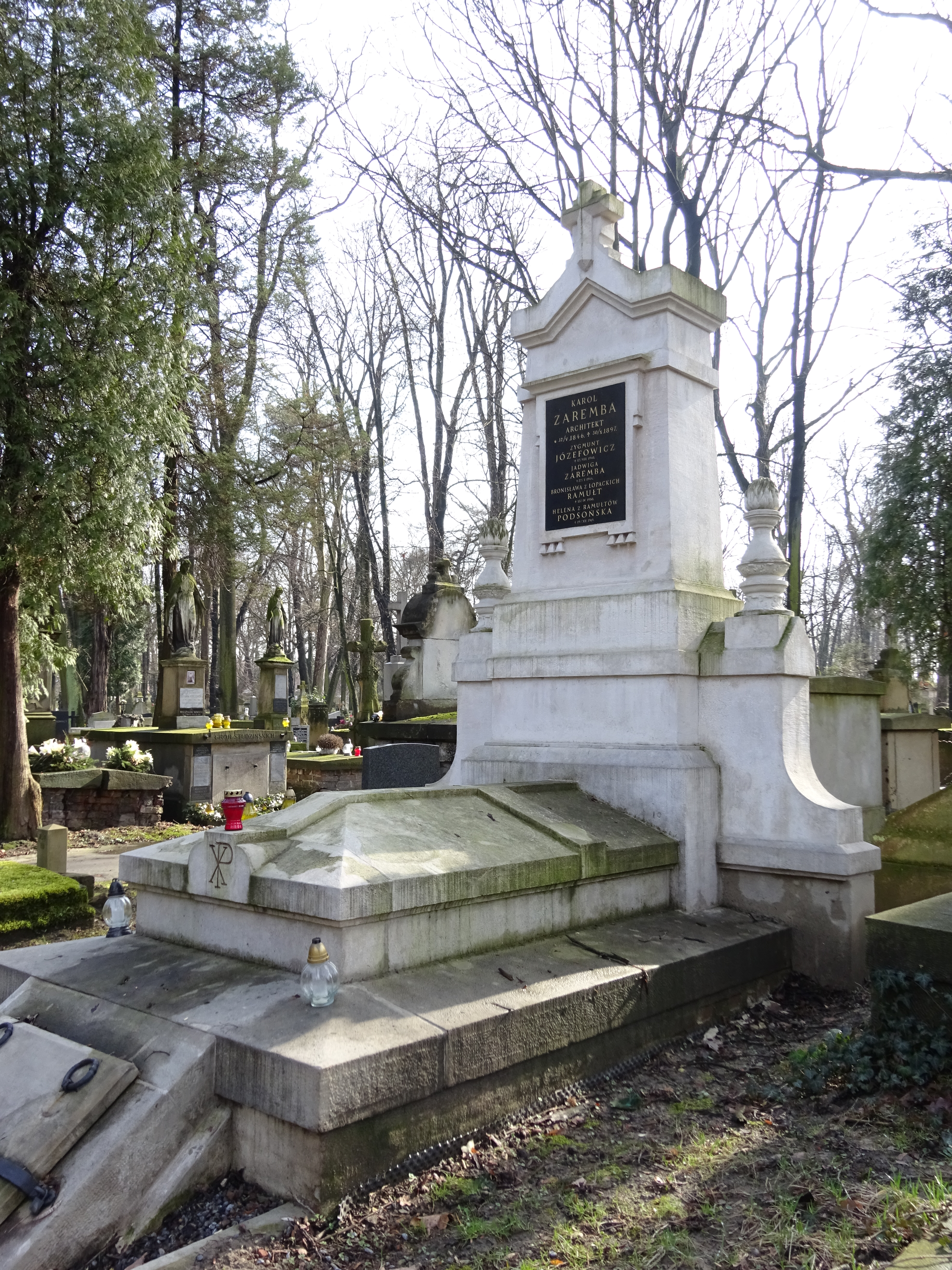
Zaremba's grave in Rakowicki Cemetery

Karol Zaremba (12 May 1846 – 30 October 1897) was a Polish architect.

He studied at the Cracow Institute of Technology. After the January uprising in which he took part, he continued his education in Berlin and traveled to Italy. From 1875 he settled permanently in Kraków. He was a member of the Kraków Technical Society, city councilman, along with Stanisław Domański. He dealt with the matter of waterworks in Kraków. He designed public buildings, promoted Berlin architecture in the spirit of late historicism.

His work includes:

- The building of the Charity Society together with the chapel from 1881 to 1883 at street Koletek
- Educational institution for girls along with the church and Monastery of the Sisters of Our Lady of Mercy in Łagiewniki from 1889 to 1891
- Surgical Hospital – II Department of Surgery, Jagiellonian University, so-called "Red Surgery" at Kopernika 21 street (1892–1893)
- Tenements at Basztowa 18 (1877), Sławkowska 32 (1883), Westerplatte 4 and 5 (1889–1894) Garncarska 14, own house at ulica Garncarska 16 (1894–1898)
- Rebuilt the chapels at the Bishop's Palace in 1886

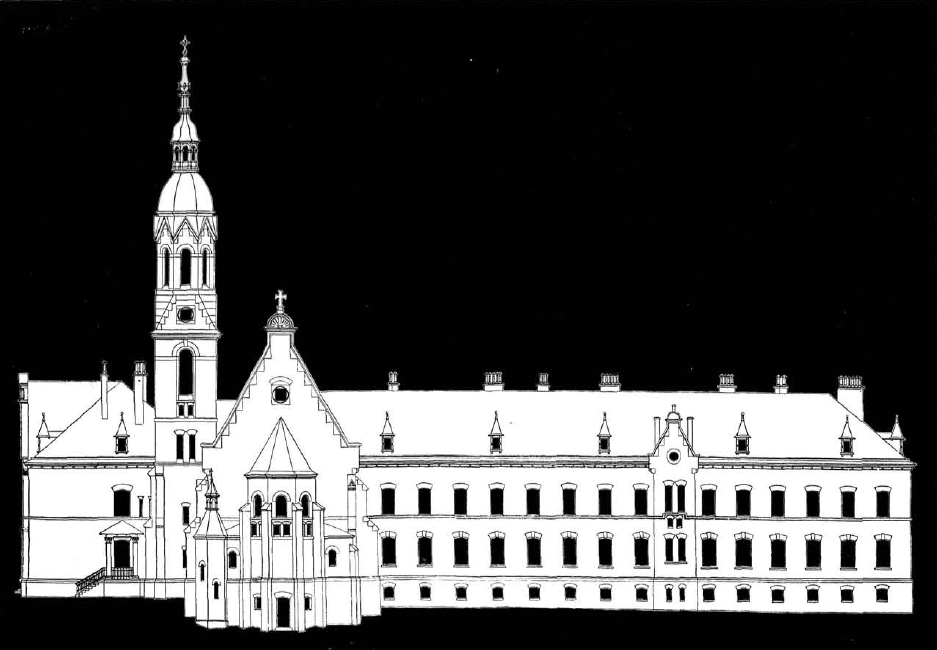
Monastery of the Sisters of Our Lady of Mercy, Kraków

He wrote articles for the Technical Magazine, among others about preserving architectural monuments in our country and about the goals and tasks of the future congress of Polish technicians (1881). In the years 1883–1889, the Kraków and Lviv Technical Societies had a joint "Technical Magazine", in which Tadeusz Stryjeński, Tomasz Pryliński and Wincenty Wdowiszewski published their articles.

He designed the Jordan Park in 1887, occasional decorations, for example, the visit of Emperor Franz Joseph I in 1880 in Kraków and the funeral of Adam Mickiewicz in 1890.

He was buried at the main alley of the Rakowicki Cemetery.
