= Raven Tenement =

- Kamienica Pod Krukami
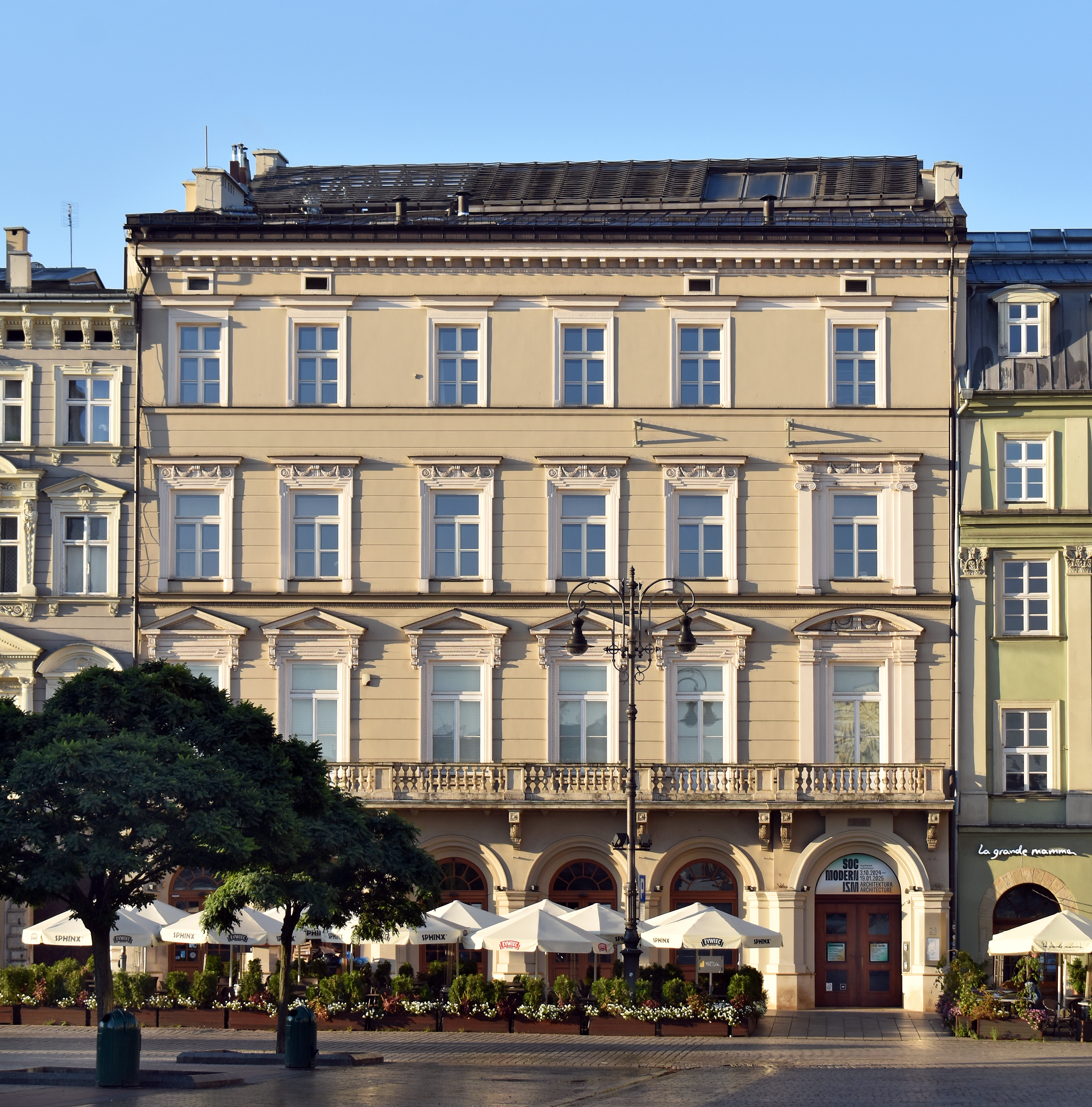
- Interactive map of the Raven Tenement area

General information
- Location: 25 Main Market Square, Kraków, Poland
- Coordinates: 50°03′40.0″N 19°56′08.6″E
- Completed: 19th century

Raven Tenement (Polish: Kamienica Pod Krukami, Pod Kruki) is a tenement house in Kraków, Poland, located at 25 Main Market Square within the Old Town district.

== History ==
Built in the 19th century by merging and completely reconstructing two Gothic townhouses, these buildings were purchased in the mid-1800s by Anna Tyszkiewicz —the niece of Prince Józef Poniatowski. In the latter half of the 19th century, the structure was remodeled under the direction of Tomasz Pryliński.

During World War II, the building was taken over by the Germans and converted into the local headquarters of the Nazi Party.

Since 1991, it has housed the International Cultural Centre (MCK) and its gallery.

On February 24, 1966, the tenement was entered into the Registry of Cultural Property. It is also entered into the municipal register of monuments of the Lesser Poland Voivodeship.
