= Garncarska Street =

Street in Kraków, Poland

Garncarska street
Kraków
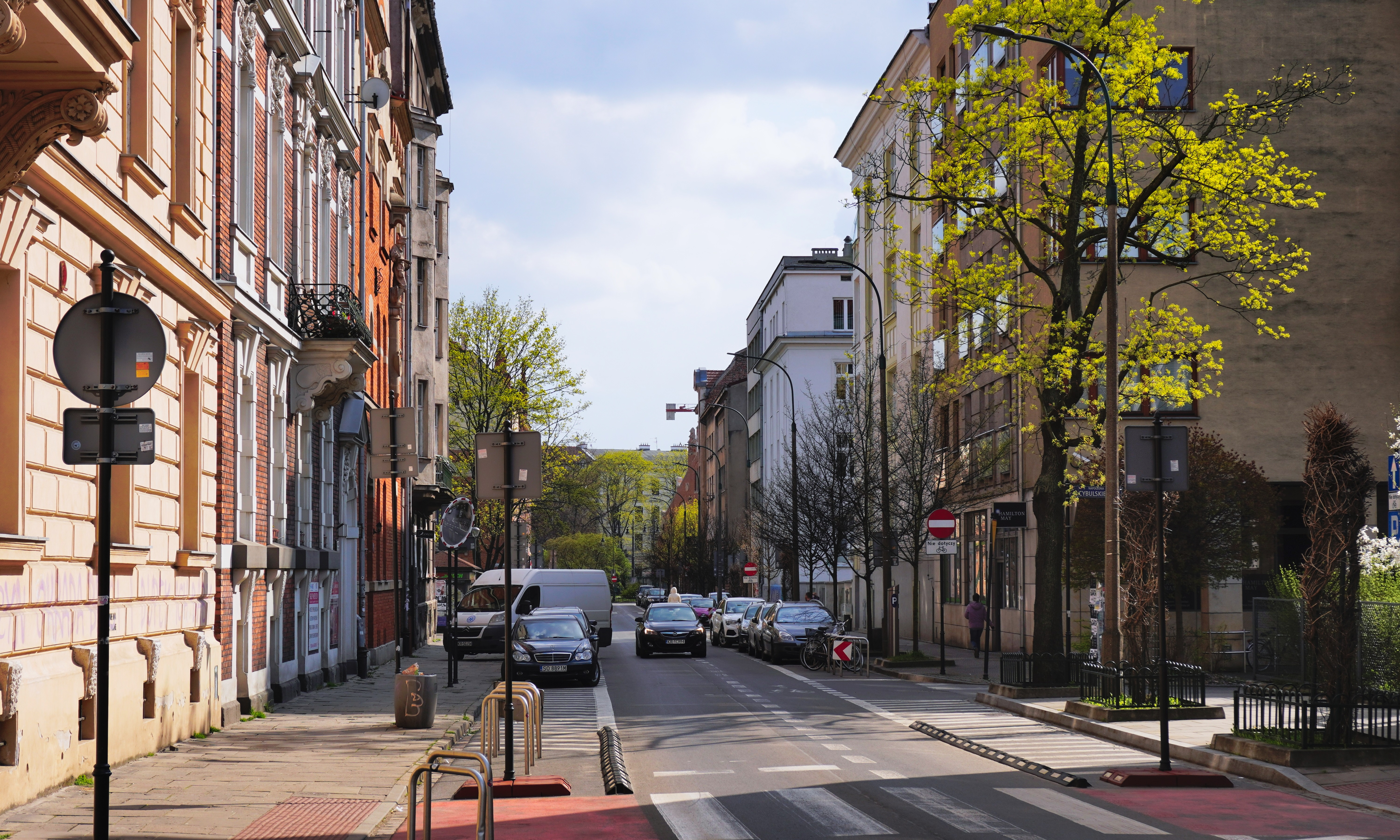
- View of the street
- Interactive map of Garncarska street
- Part of: Kraków Old Town district
- Owner: City of Kraków
- Location: Kraków, Poland

Garncarska Street in Kraków is a street in Kraków, in District I Old Town, in Piasek. It runs from Krupnicza Street to Józef Piłsudski Street, beyond the intersection of which it becomes Retoryka Street.

== History ==
The street is located in the area of a former settlement called Krupniki, documented since the 16th century, which was part of the suburban municipal jurisdiction of Garbary near Kraków. The settlement was primarily inhabited by krupnicy – craftsmen involved in the production of flour and groats. For this reason, the street has been called Krupnicza or Krupniki since the 16th century. The current name was first mentioned in 1836 and was also used at that time to refer to what is now Krupnicza Street. Regulations in 1883 and 1896 shaped Garncarska Street into its current route.

== Buildings ==
The street is primarily lined with 2- and 3-story tenement houses from the late 19th and early 20th centuries, built in eclectic and modernist styles.

- 2 Garncarska Street (30 Krupnicza Street) – Secession-style tenement house designed by Kazimierz Zieliński in 1906.
- 4 Garncarska Street – Secession-style tenement house designed by Kazimierz Zieliński in 1906. On the front wall, there is a plaque commemorating General Zygmunt Zieliński, who lived in this building, installed in 2007.
- 5 Garncarska Street – Historic tenement house (listed in the register of immovable monuments of the Lesser Poland Voivodeship). Built in 1893.
- 6 Garncarska Street – House with a facade featuring simplified historical-style decoration. In 1986, a plaque commemorating Stanisław Okoń was embedded in the tenement's facade.
- 8 Garncarska Street – Eclectic-style tenement house designed by Paweł Barański (?) in 1879.
- 9 Garncarska Street – Tenement house with modernist architectural features, designed by Roman Bandurski and Wiktor Miarczyński in 1912.
- 10 Garncarska Street (29 Studencka Street) – Eclectic-style tenement house designed by Karol Rybiński in 1894.
- 11–13 Garncarska Street – The building of the former Lecznica Związkowa (Union Clinic). Designed by Tadeusz Stryjeński and Franciszek Mączyński in 1910–1911. Originally built in a modernist style with elements of manor architecture, it was thoroughly reconstructed in 1929–1930 with Mączyński's involvement. The building was raised, expanded with a side pavilion, and lost most of its original stylistic features. Currently, it houses the Maria Skłodowska-Curie National Institute of Oncology.
- 12 Garncarska Street (14 Studencka Street) – Eclectic-style tenement house designed by Władysław Ekielski in 1892–1893.
- 14 Garncarska Street – Eclectic-style tenement house designed by Karol Zaremba in 1893–1895.
- 16 Garncarska Street – Eclectic-style tenement house with sgraffito decoration and an allegorical sculpture by Tadeusz Błotnicki. Designed by Karol Zaremba as his own residence in 1896–1898. Listed in the register of monuments.
- 18 Garncarska Street (1 Władysław Sikorski Square) – The Stanisław Bilski Student House (currently a nurses' hotel). Designed by Tadeusz Stryjeński and Franciszek Mączyński in 1928. Listed in the register of monuments.
- 19 Garncarska Street – Modernist-style tenement house designed by Ludwik Wojtyczko in 1936.
- 21 Garncarska Street – Modernist-style tenement house designed by Stanisław Wexner and Henryk Jakubowicz in 1937. The building is part of the "Modernist Heraldry of Tenements" trail. Above the entrance, there is a large bas-relief emblem depicting a kneeling female figure with birds flying toward her from both sides. The lower part bears the signature "LW".
- 23 Garncarska Street (1 Wenecja Street) – Pod Lwem (Under the Lion) or Pod Świętym Markiem (Under St. Mark) tenement house, also known as the Venetian House. Designed by Kazimierz Hroboni in 1911–1912. Listed in the register of monuments. On the front wall, there is a plaque commemorating former residents: Władysław Żeleński, Piotr Stachiewicz, Antoni Procajłowicz, and Jan Świerczyński. The plaque, unveiled in 1991, was created by Antoni Kostrzewa.
- 24–26 Garncarska Street – The Church of the Sacred Heart of Jesus and the monastery complex of the Sisters of the Sacred Heart. Designed by Władysław Kaczmarski in 1895–1900. The monastery and chapel are listed in the register of monuments.
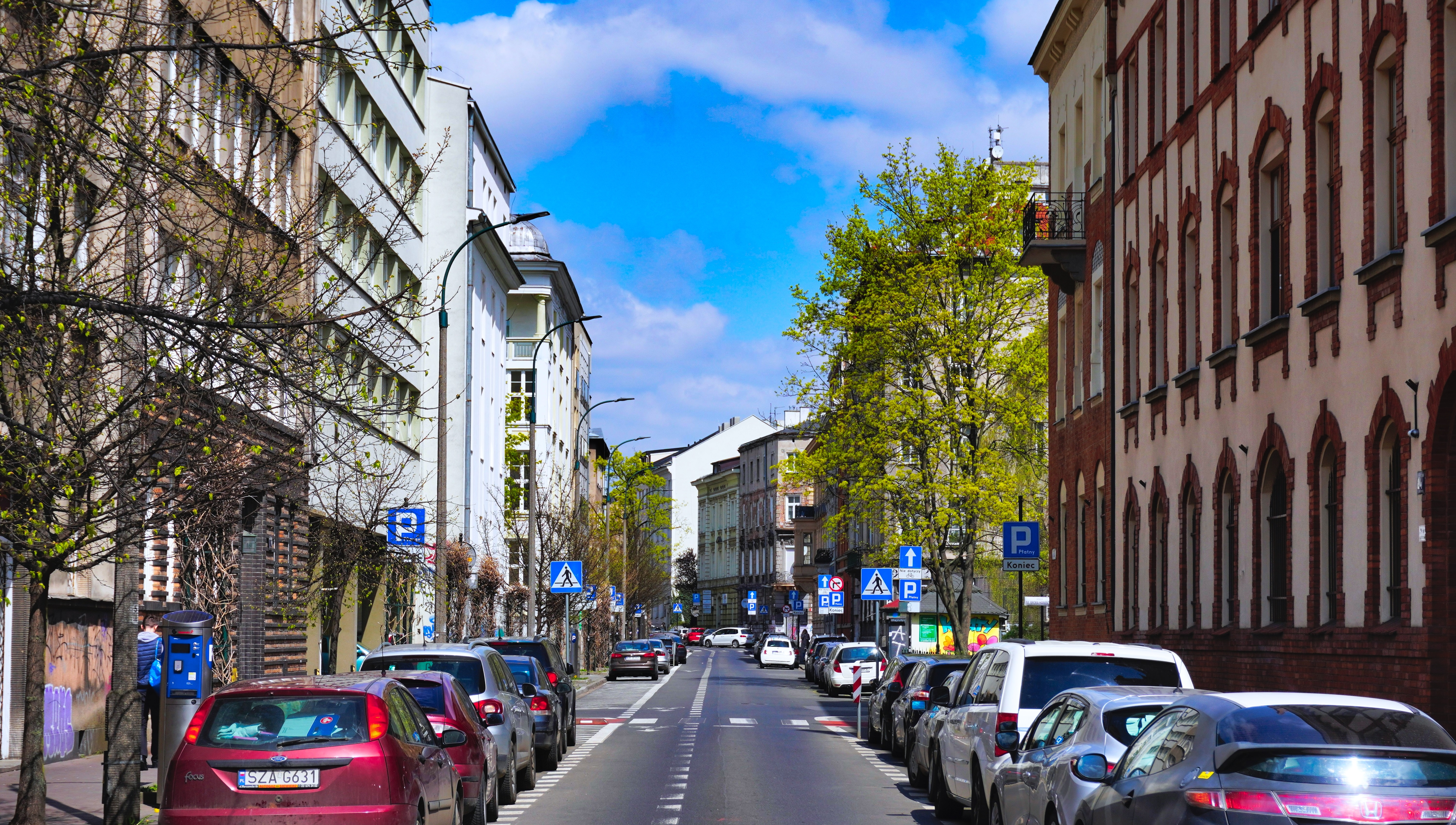
View from the Wenecja Street to north

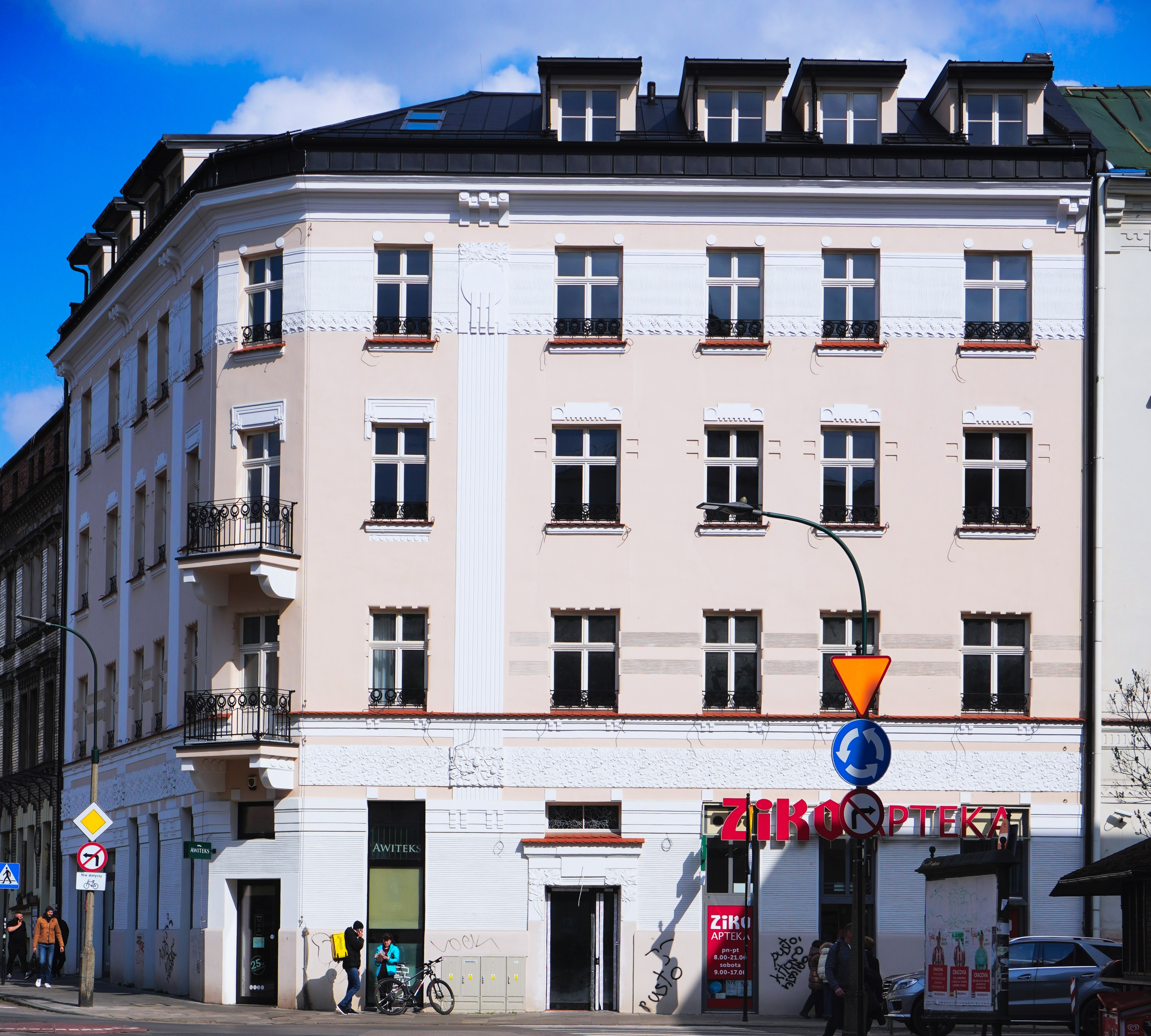
2 Garncarska Street (30 Krupnicza Street)
Tenement house (design. Kazimierz Zieliński, 1906)

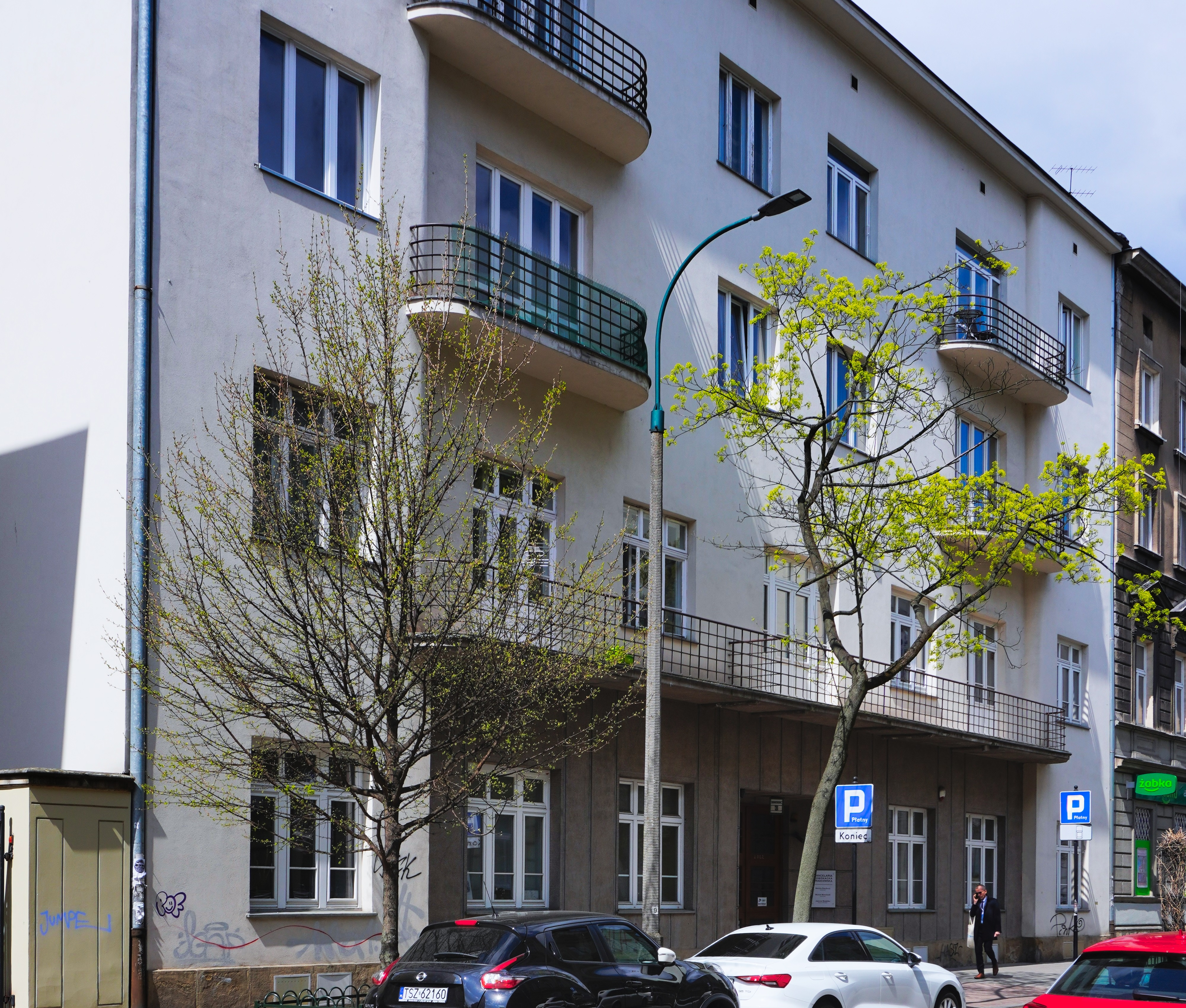
3 Garncarska Street
Modernist tenement house

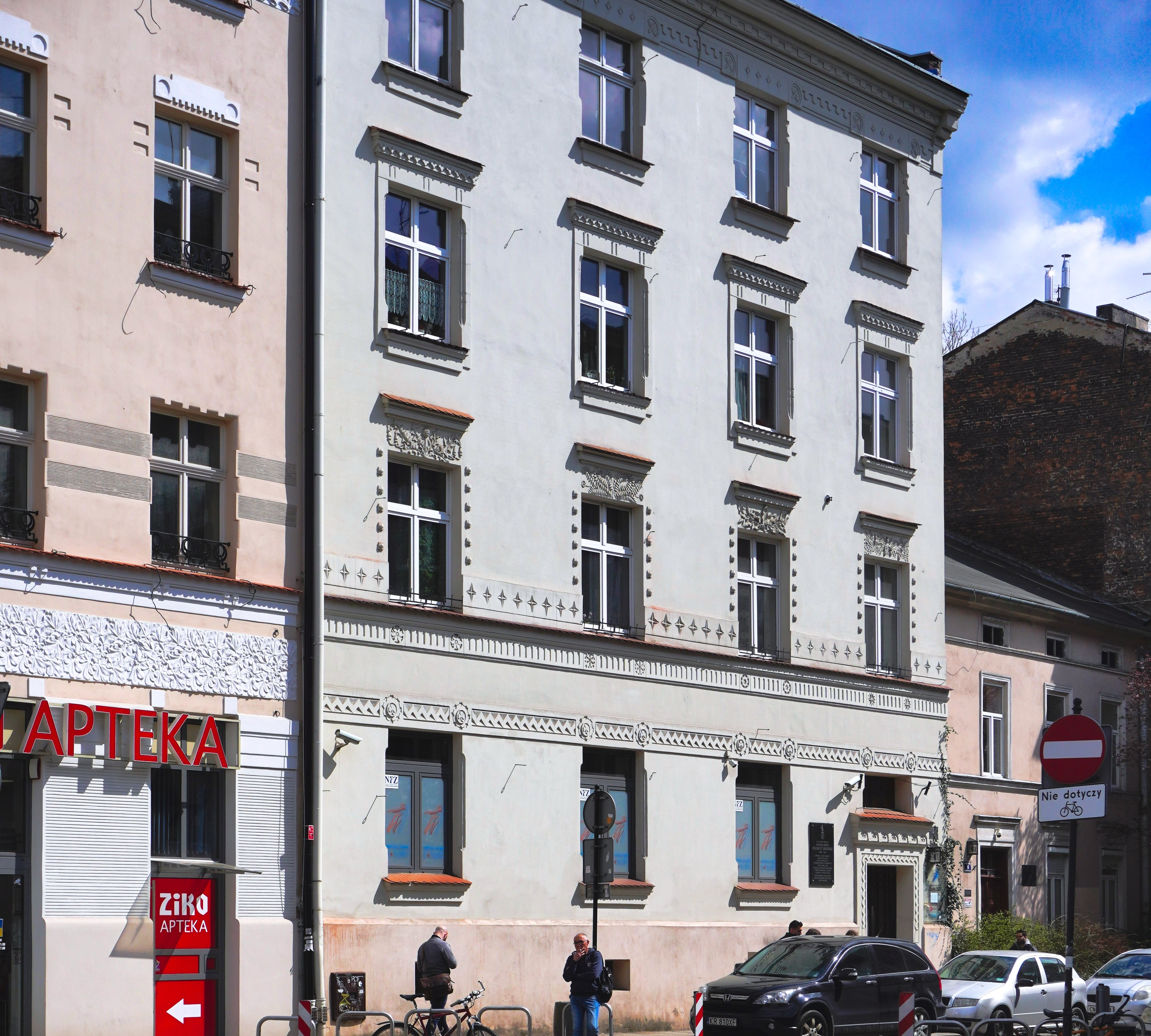
4 Garncarska Street
Tenement house (design. Kazimierz Zieliński, 1906)

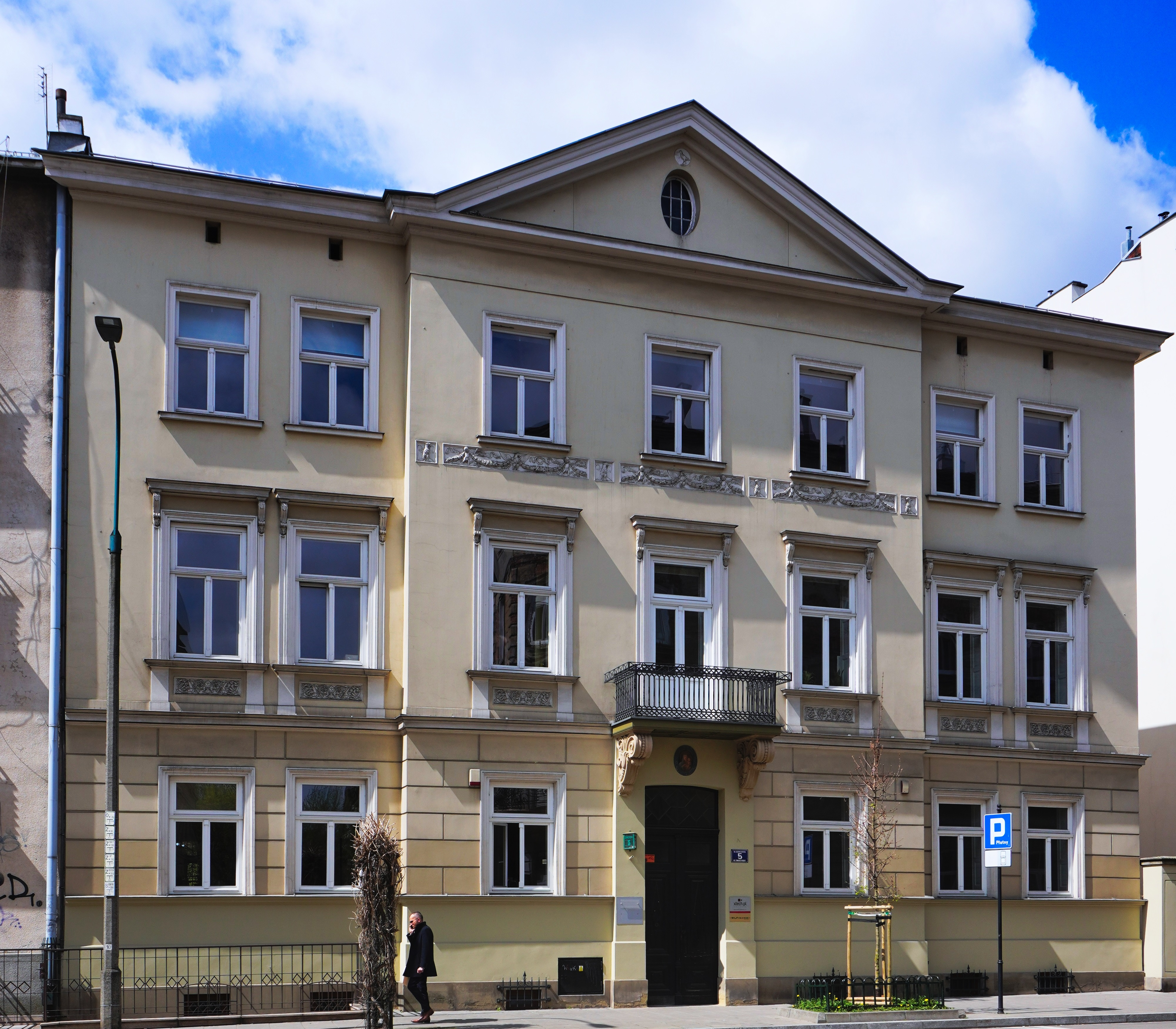
5 Garncarska Street
Tenement house

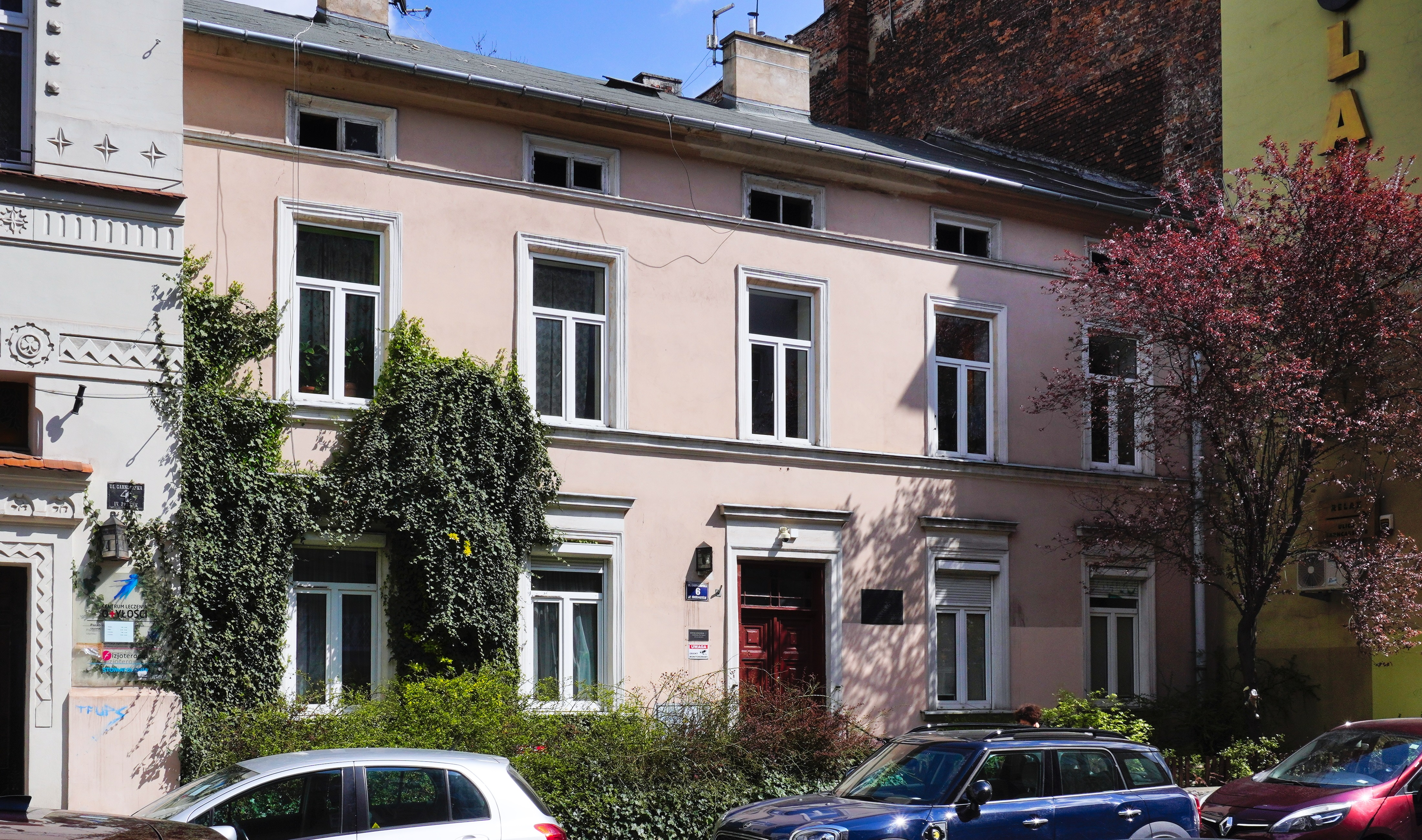
6 Garncarska Street
Tenement house

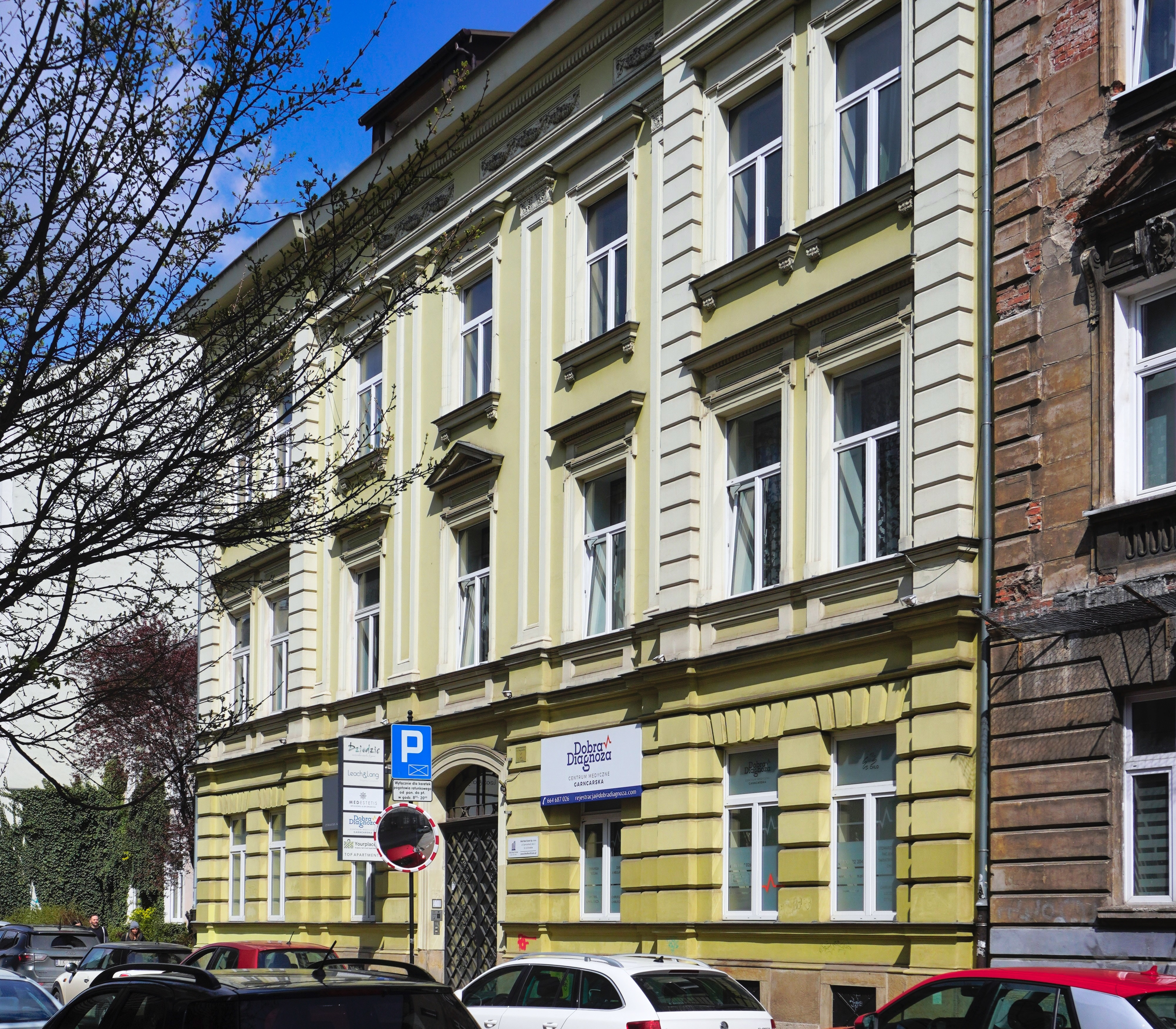
8 Garncarska Street
Tenement house (design. Paweł Barański (?), 1879)

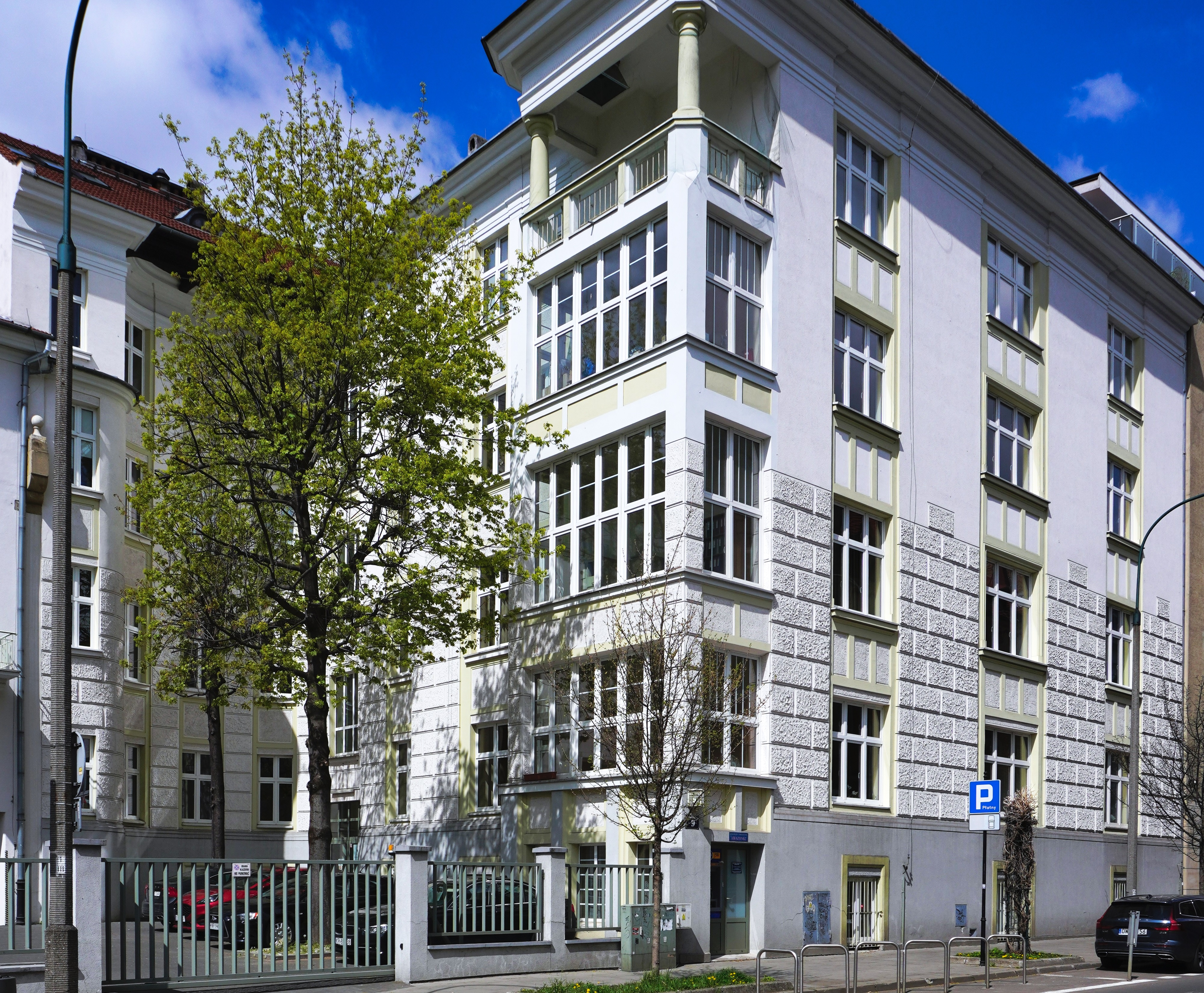
9 Garncarska Street
Tenement house (design. Roman Bandurski i Wiktor Miarczyński, 1912)

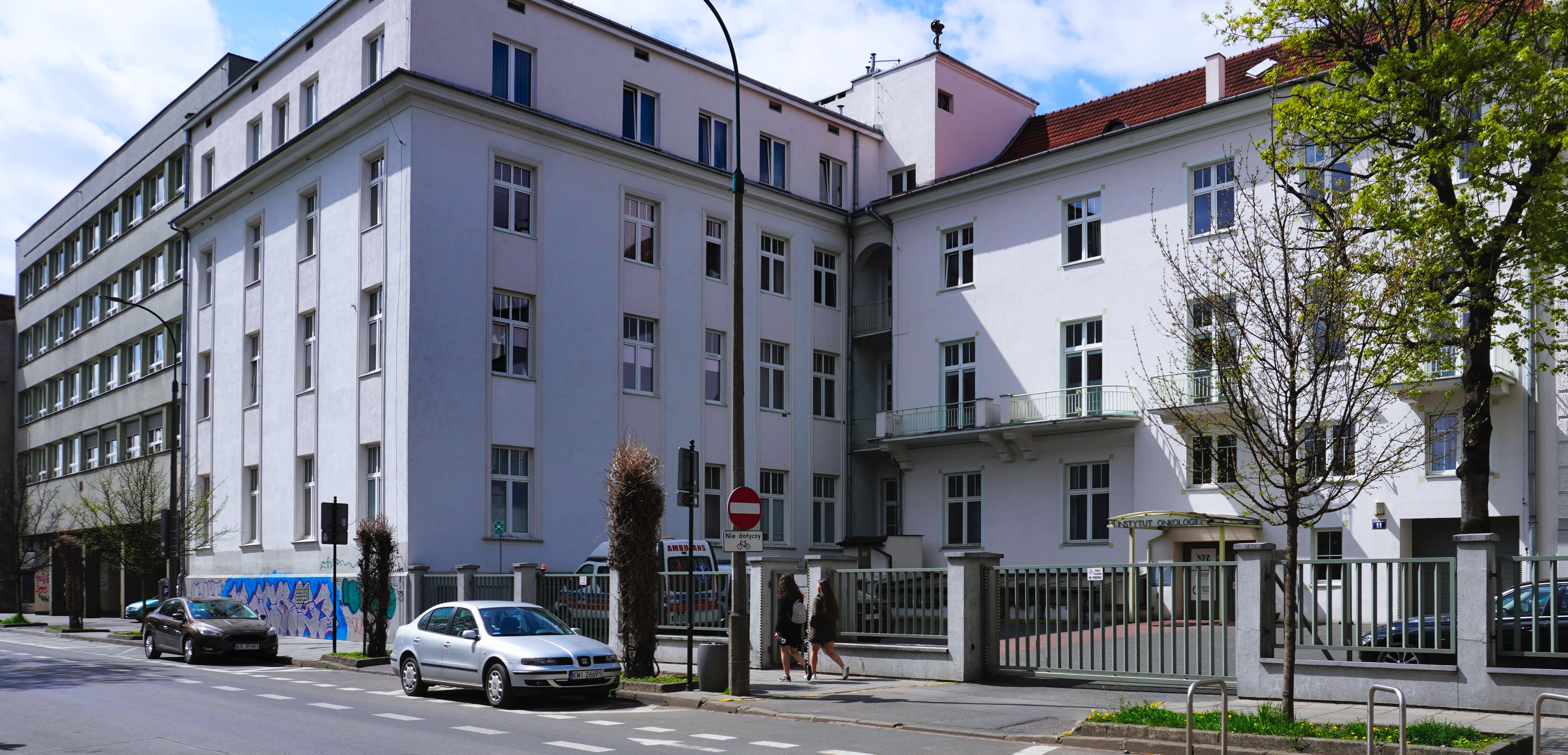
11–13 Garncarska Street
The building of the former Trade Union Clinic, currently the seat of the National Institute of Oncology. Maria Skłodowska-Curie (proj. Tadeusz Stryjeński and Franciszek Mączyński, 1910–1911)

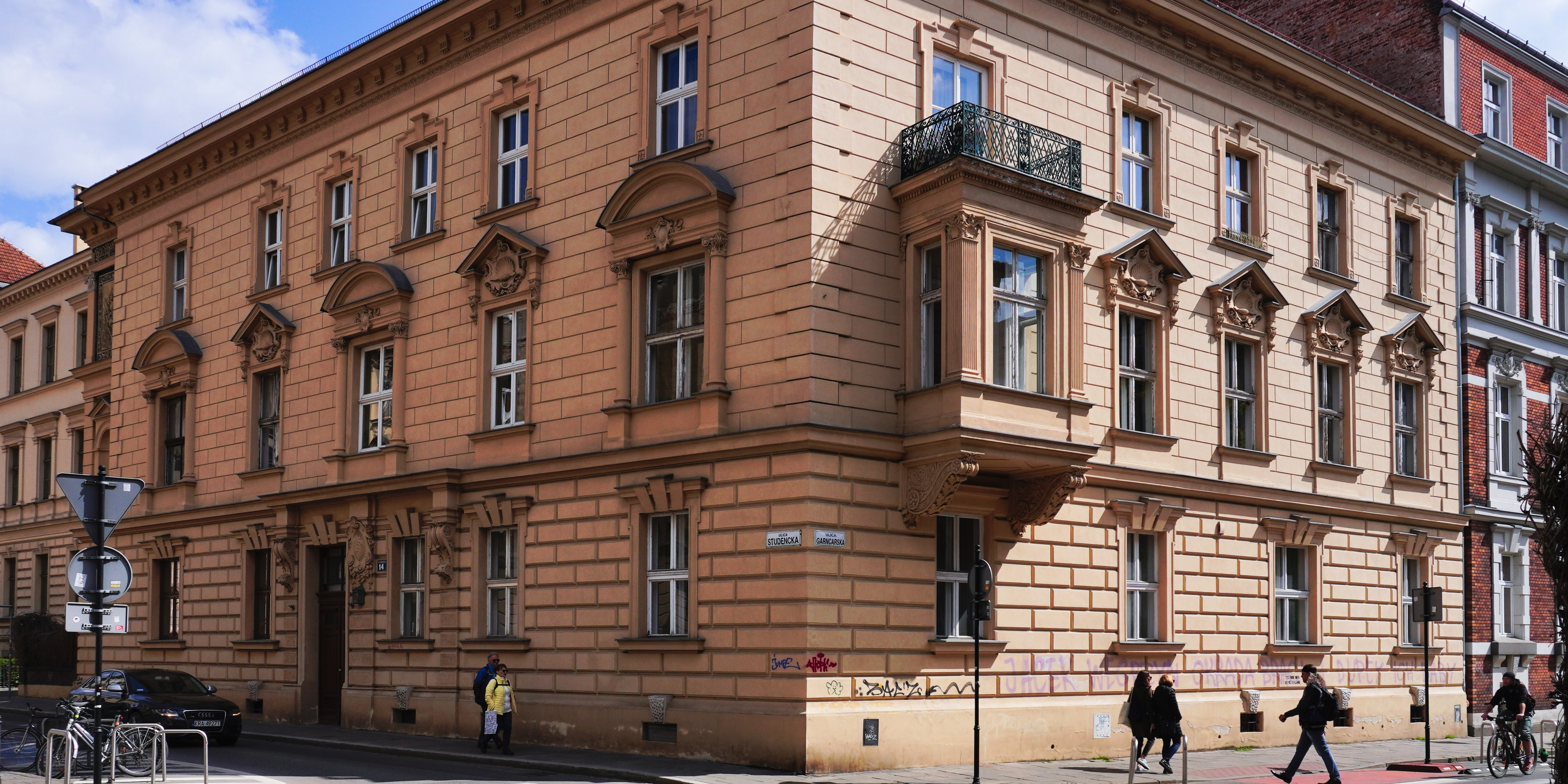
12 Garncarska Street (14 Studencka Street)
Tenement house (design. Władysław Ekielski, 1892–1893)

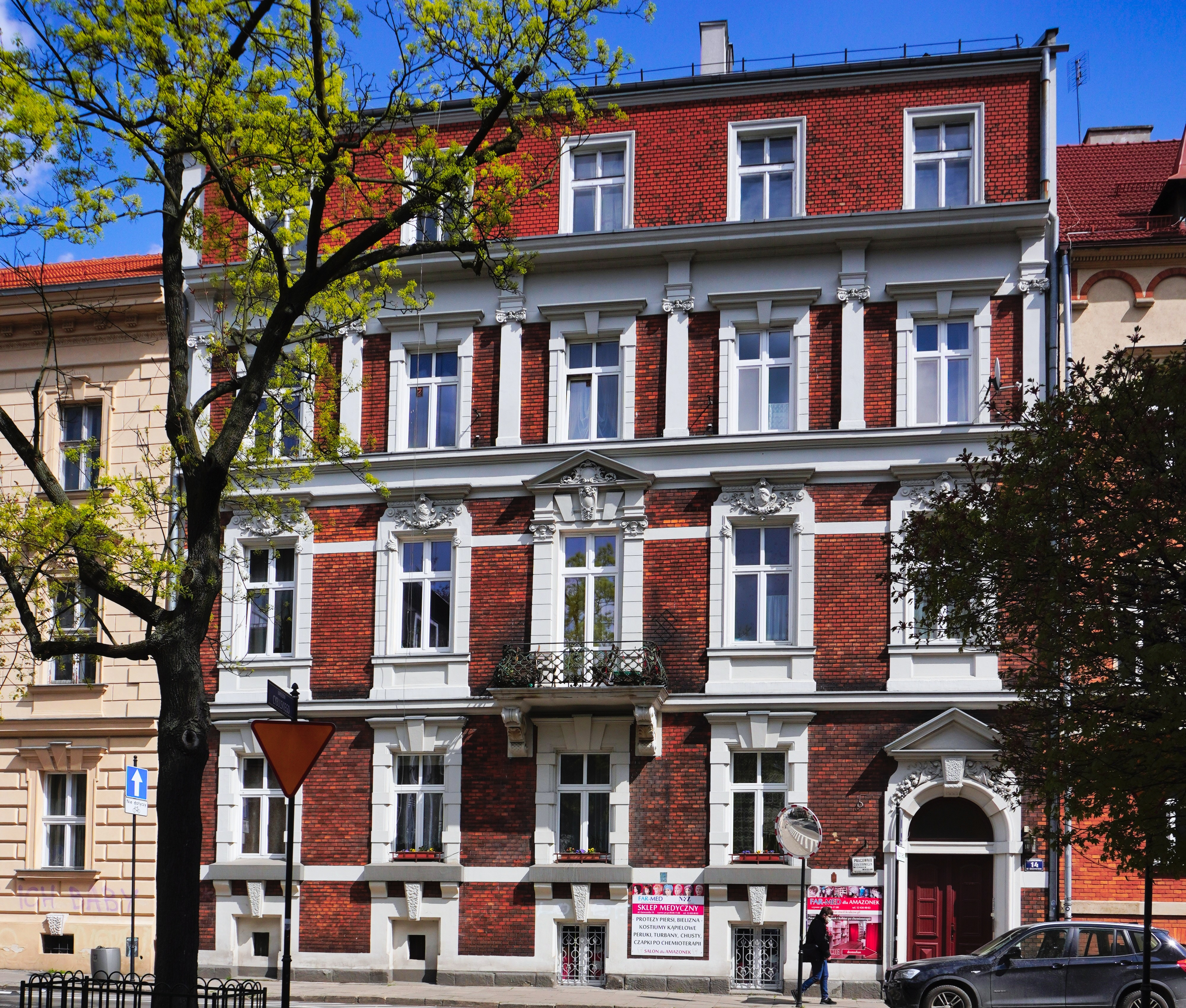
14 Garncarska Street
Tenement house (design. Karol Zaremba, 1893–1895)

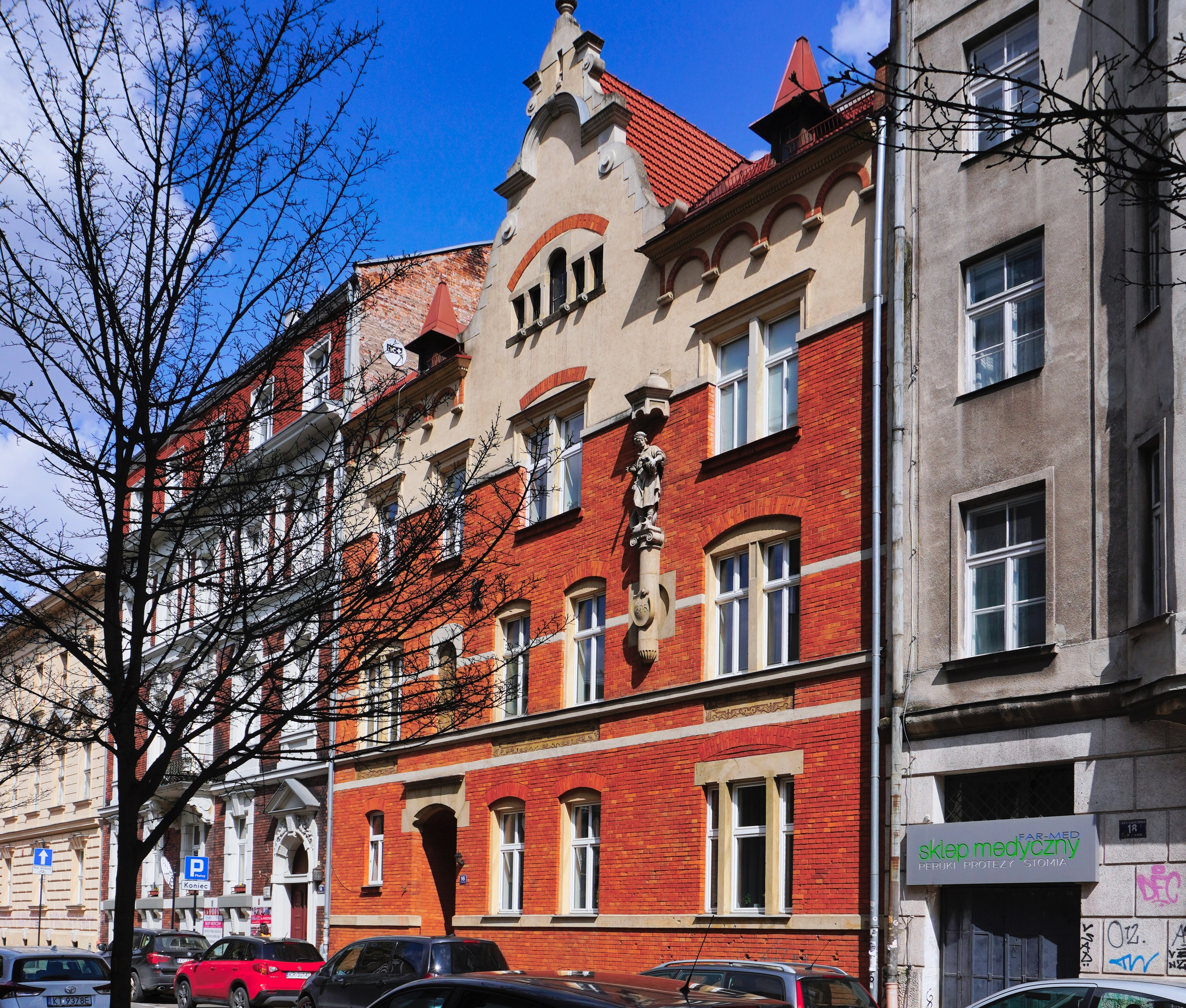
16 Garncarska Street
Tenement house (design. Karol Zaremba, 1896–1898)

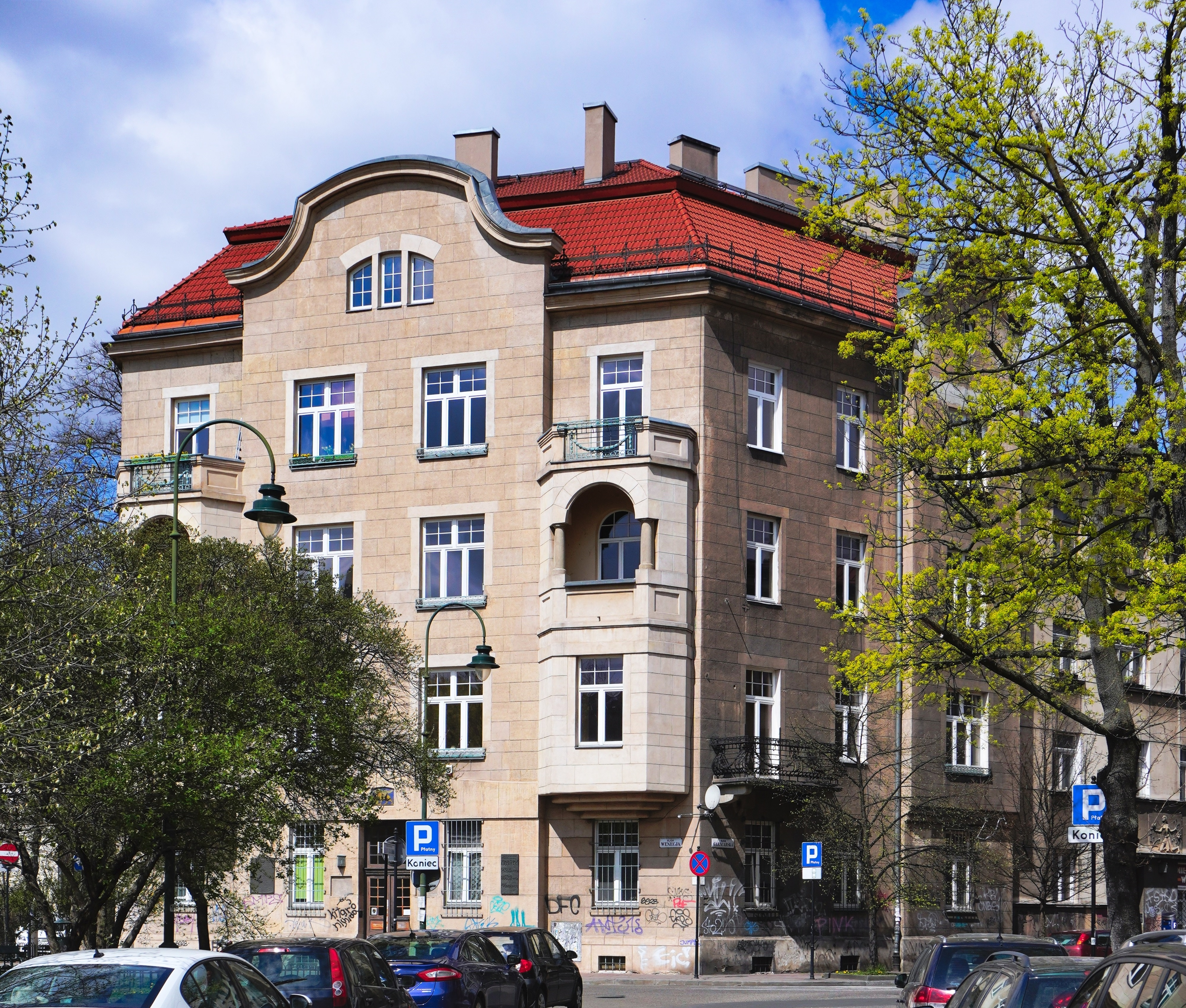
23 Garncarska Street (1 Wenecja Street)
Tenement house Pod Lwem (Dom Wenecki) (design. Kazimierz Hroboni, 1911–1912)

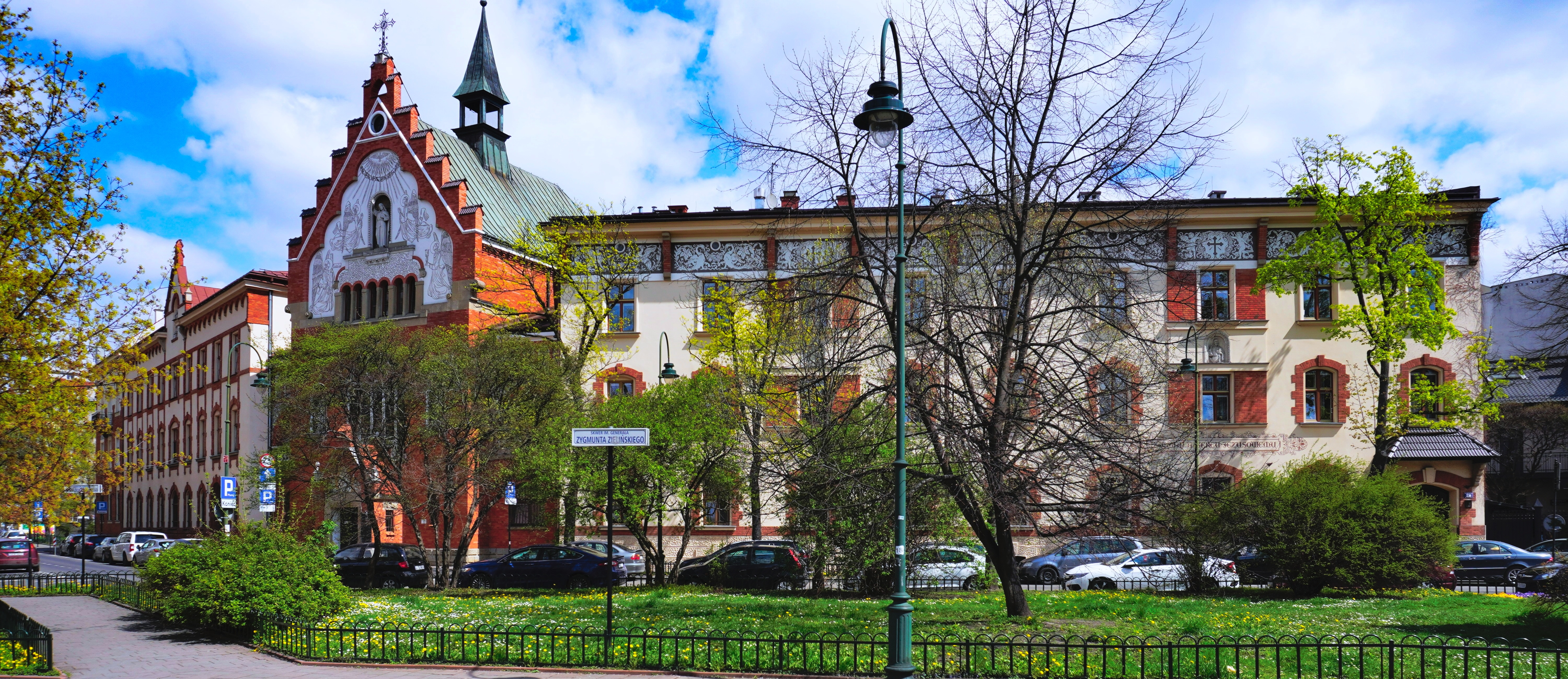
24–26 Garncarska Street
Church of the Sacred Heart of Jesus and the monastery of the Sisters of the Sacred Heart (design. Władysław Kaczmarski, 1895–1900)

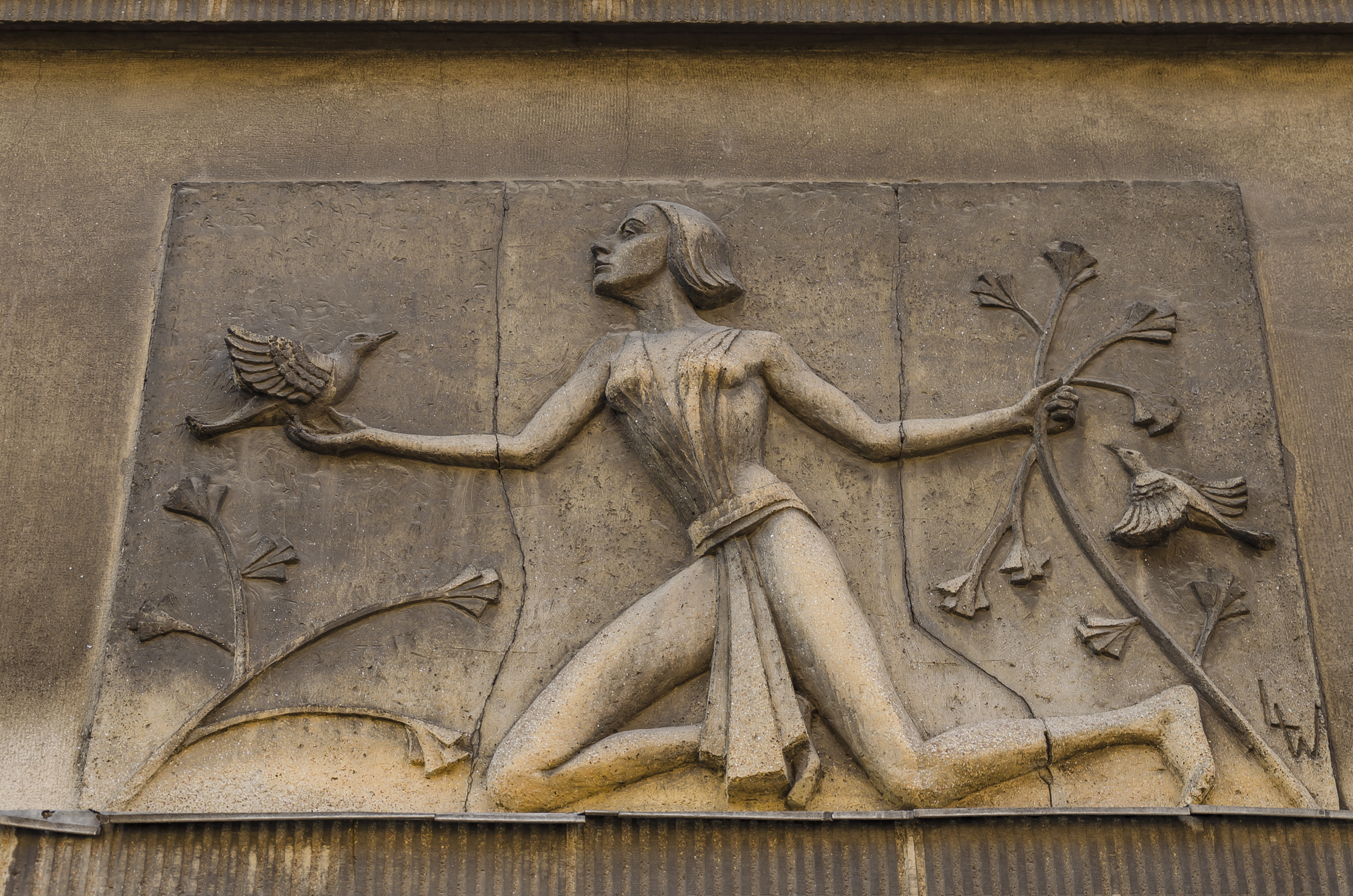
21 Garncarska Street
The emblem on the tenement house
