= Bishop's Palace, Kraków =

Historic building in Poland

Bishop's Palace in Kraków
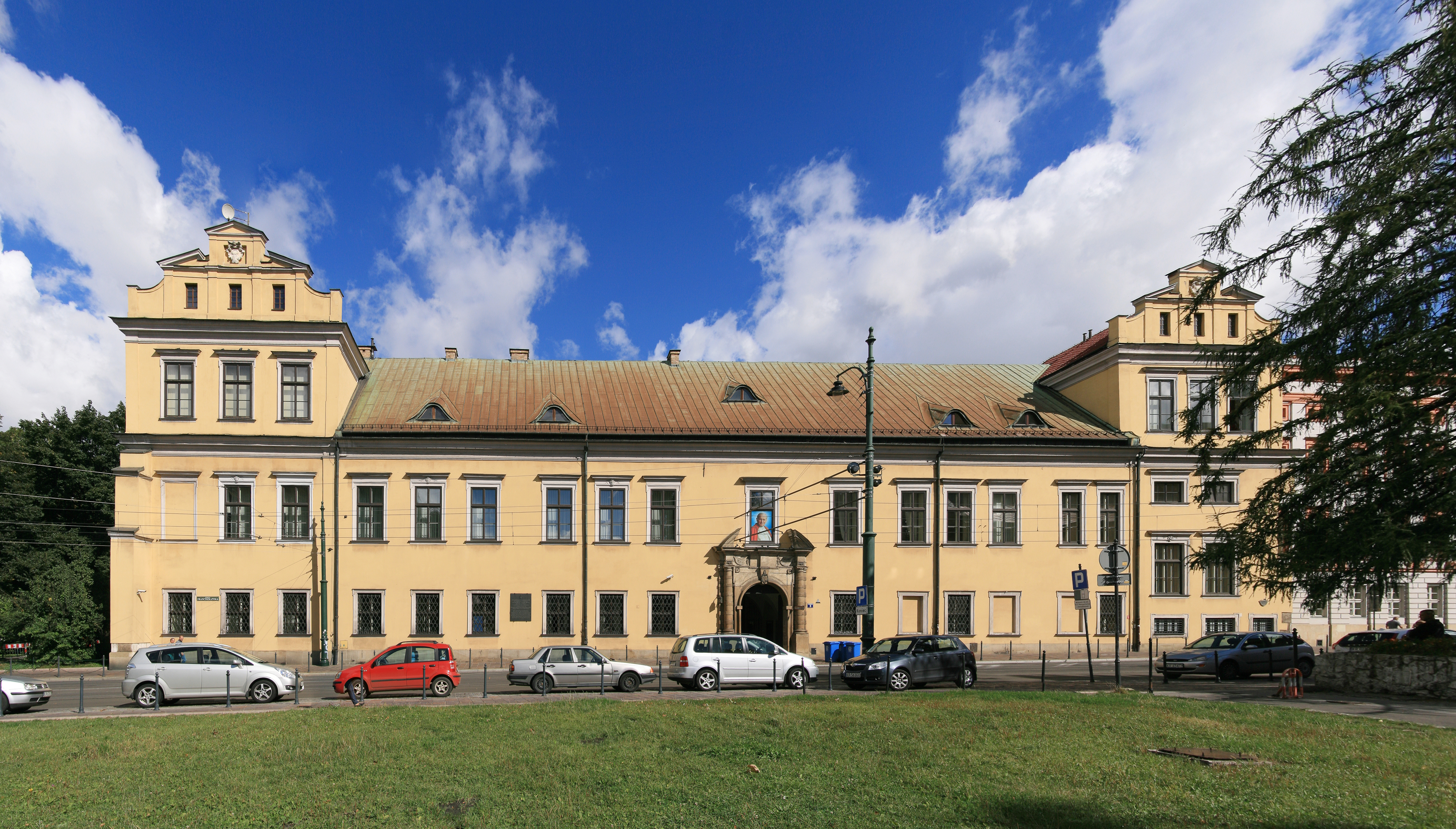
- Main façade as seen from the ul. Franciszkańska

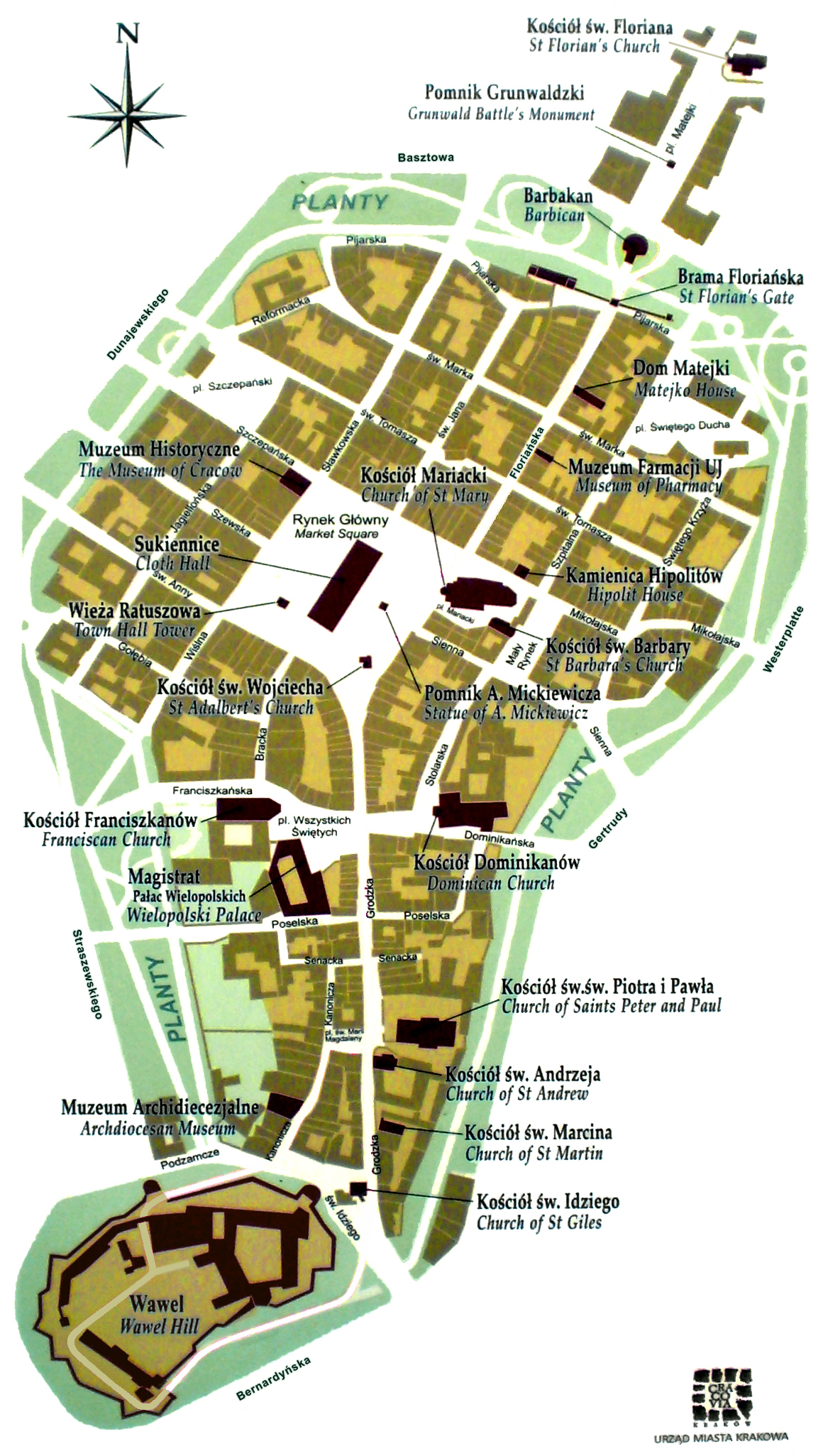
- Palace location in Kraków Old Town (centre-left)

The Bishop's Palace in Kraków (Polish: Pałac Biskupi w Krakowie) is the seat of Kraków metropolitan Curia, Poland, and the traditional residence of Kraków bishops since the late 14th century. It is the second largest palace in the city after Wawel, the former seat of the Polish monarchs. It is part of a monastery complex of the Franciscan religious order. Bishop's Palace is best known for being the residence of Pope John Paul II during his stays in the city. He used to give his blessings and talk to his followers from a window above the main entrance at night.

As of March 2022, the archbishop is Marek Jedraszewski.

== History ==
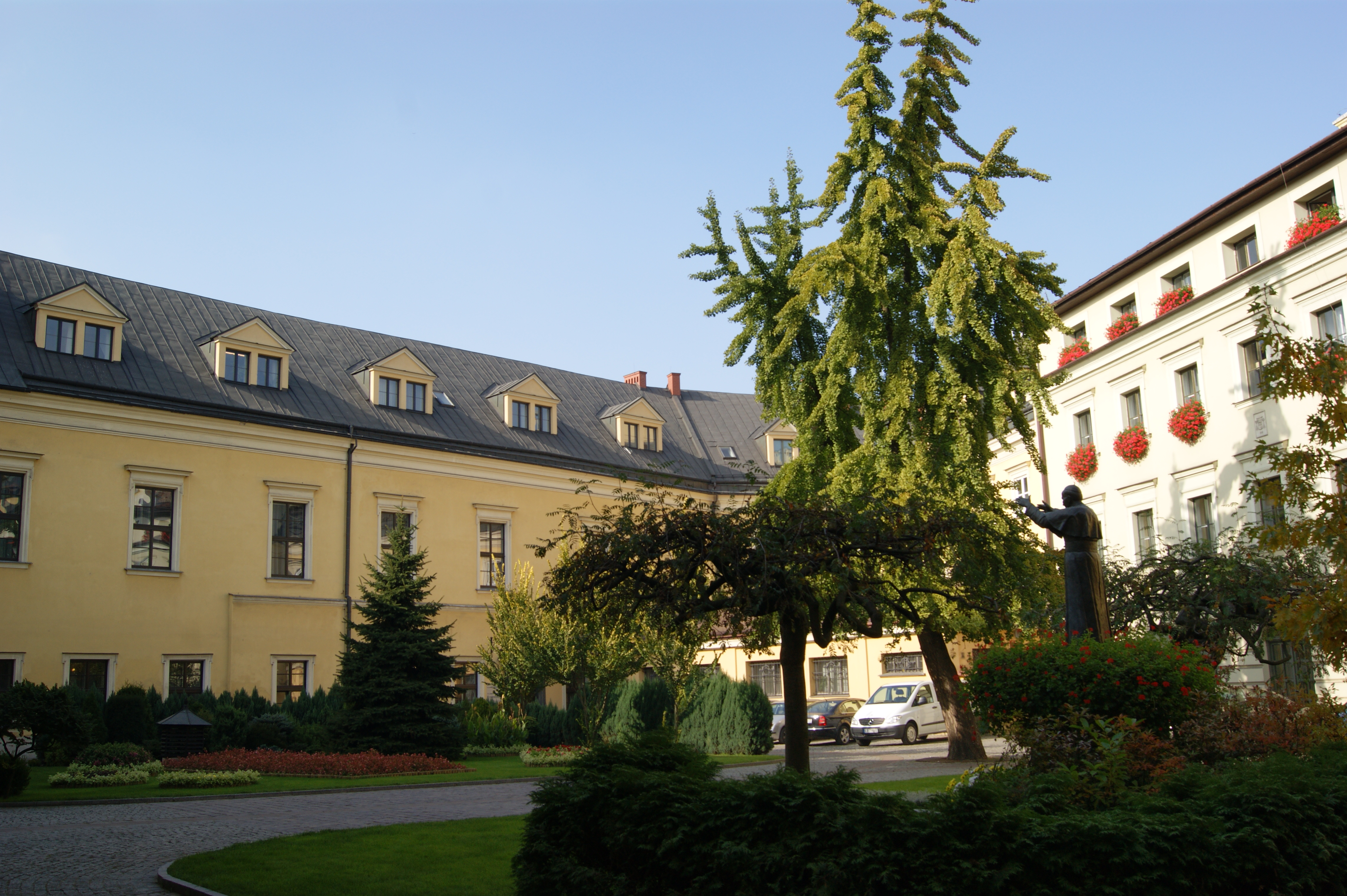
Palace courtyard with bronze statue of John Paul II, by Jole Sensi Croci

Before the palace was built, the bishopric of Kraków had been located at Wawel since 1000, where the remains of earlier buildings still exist. The palace is erected in its present location at ul. Franciszkańska 3 street, across from the historic Franciscan Church in Kraków, was mentioned for the first time in the 14th century. It was consumed by fire in 1462 and then rebuilt. The palace was reconstructed with a new staircase and rusticated portals by Bishop Piotr Gembicki in 1642-1647. It was renovated after the Swedish invasion in 1655, and refurbished again in 1817-1820 by Szczepan Humbert. In 1850, a citywide fire burned most of the furnishings and exhibits of national mementoes. Architect Tomasz Pryliński supervised the renovation of the palace in 1881–1884. Despite its turbulent history, including fires and various national calamities such as the Partitions, the palace always served its original purpose.

In March 2022, Archbishop Marek Jedraszewski welcomed some refugees from the 2022 Russian invasion of Ukraine to live with him there.

== Architecture ==
The palace is a well-preserved example of 19th-century architecture, with elements of Polish Renaissance and Baroque decorations, including an arcaded loggia in the courtyard, added by architect Gabriel Słoński around 1567. The general layout of the palace established by the mid-17th century remains unchanged despite later renovations.

== John Paul II ==
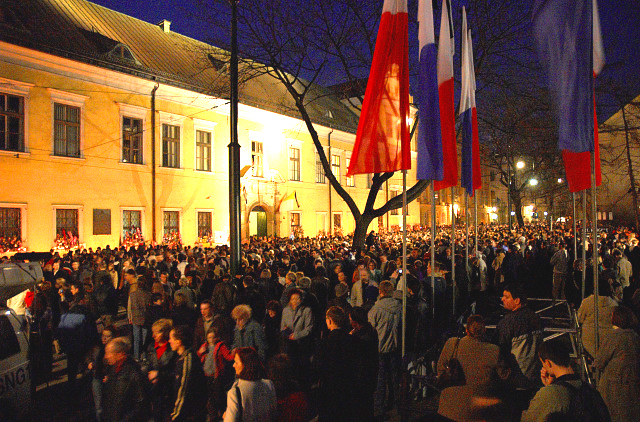
Palace during ceremony, April 3, 2005

The palace, usually closed to visitors except for a museum, is one of the more popular religious destinations connected with the life of Pope John Paul II. Between 1958 and 1978, the palace was a residence of Cardinal Karol Wojtyła, who in October 1978 became the first Slavic Pope in history, adopting the name John Paul II. Wojtyła had first lived in the complex during World War II, when he was a student of the clandestine Kraków Archdiocese Seminary run by Cardinal Adam Stefan Sapieha during the Nazi Occupation of Poland. Following an August 6, 1944, Nazi roundup of thousands of men and boys in Kraków, in which Wojtyła narrowly escaped capture, Sapieha insisted that the seminary students stay in the Bishop's Palace until the Germans left the city. Wojtyła was ordained to the priesthood soon after the end of the war, on November 1, 1946, by Sapieha in his private chapel. Housed not far from the palace (at ul. Kanonicza 19 street) is the Archdiocesan Museum (Polish: Muzeum Archidiecezjalne), where many relevant artifacts can be found.

Following John Paul II's death on 2 April 2005, some 40,000 Catholics gathered before the palace for a night vigil and prayer (pictured). On each anniversary of his death, thousands of flowers are placed around the building, and many fires are lit. The window above the entrance is known as the "papal window," as John Paul II spoke to the crowds that gathered to see him from here. In the courtyard stands a statue of John Paul II, sculpted and gifted to the palace by artist Jole Sensi Croci in May 1980.

== See also ==
- Palace of the Kraków Bishops in Kielce
- Miodowa Street (Warsaw)
