= Tomasz Pryliński =

Polish architect and conservator

Tomasz Pryliński ([ˈprɨliɲski]; August 24, 1847 – November 15, 1895) was a Polish architect and conservator active in Kraków during the foreign partitions of Poland. His main area of interest was the Polish Renaissance architecture. Some of his achievements included the design for major restoration of the Sukiennice Cloth Hall at the Kraków Main Square.

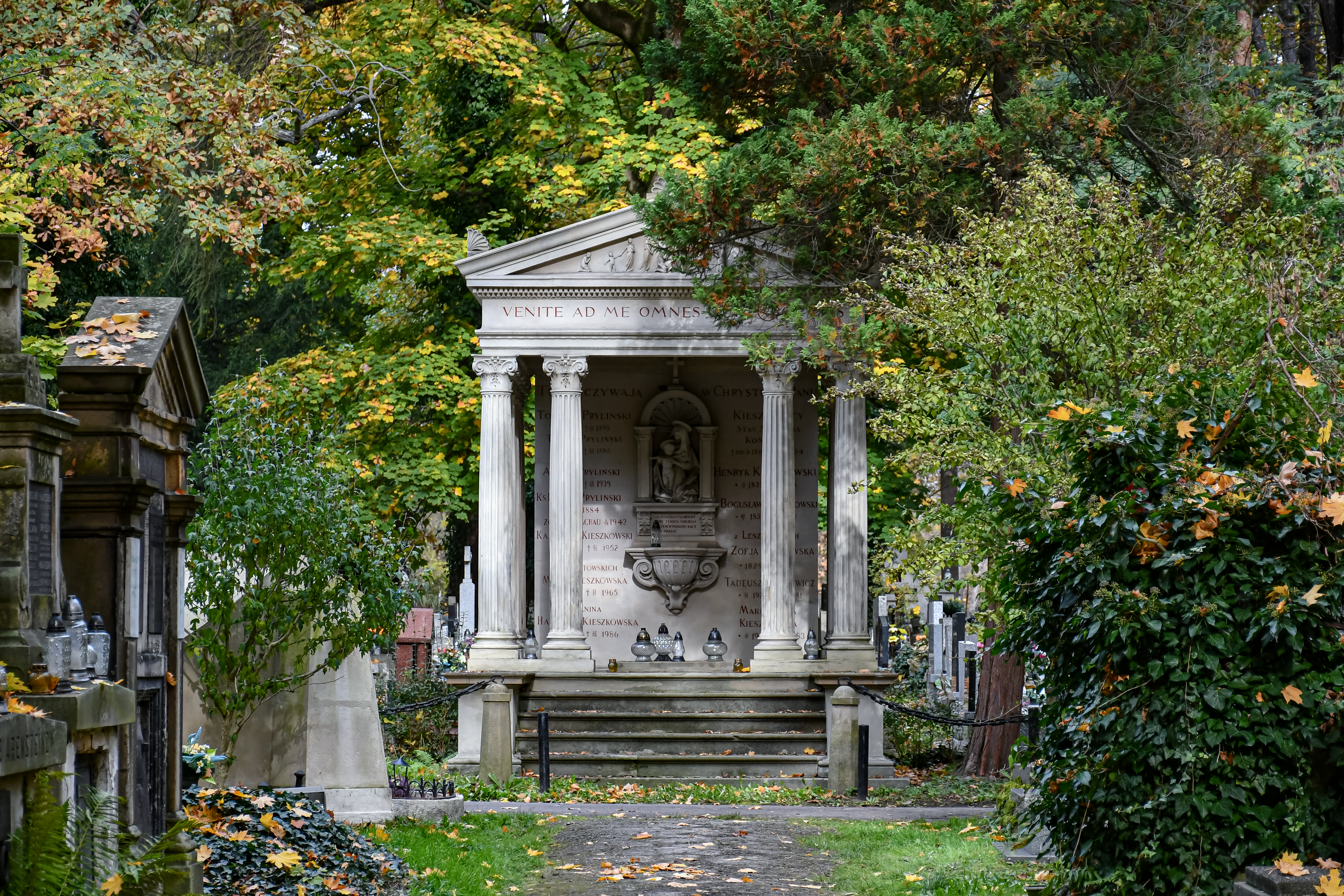
Tomasz Pryliński family tomb at the Rakowicki Cemetery in Kraków

== Career ==
Pryliński was born in Warsaw. He studied engineering in Munich at the Bavarian Polytechnic in 1862–1866, and later in Zurich where he graduated in 1869. After temporary stay in Belgium, Pryliński settled in Kraków in 1872. Initially, he worked as land surveyor for the Bank of Galicia in 1873. Soon later, he began to work as architect and construction engineer. He specialized in the Renaissance and embarked on the first ever photo-documentation of the deteriorating Wawel Castle, the traditional seat of Polish monarchs built at the behest of Casimir III the Great. He conducted conservation work at the Church of St. Francis de Sales and at the Bishop's Palace in Kraków between 1881 and 1884. Commissioned by the Mayor Mikołaj Zyblikiewicz, in 1875 Pryliński began the restoration of Sukiennice with the new Sukiennice Museum upstairs. The project was successfully completed and inaugurated with a ceremonial ball of October 3, 1879.

Pryliński died in Thalkirchen near Munich. He was brought to Kraków and laid to rest at the family tomb (pictured) built at the Rakowicki Cemetery by architect Zygmunt Langman.

== Completed projects ==
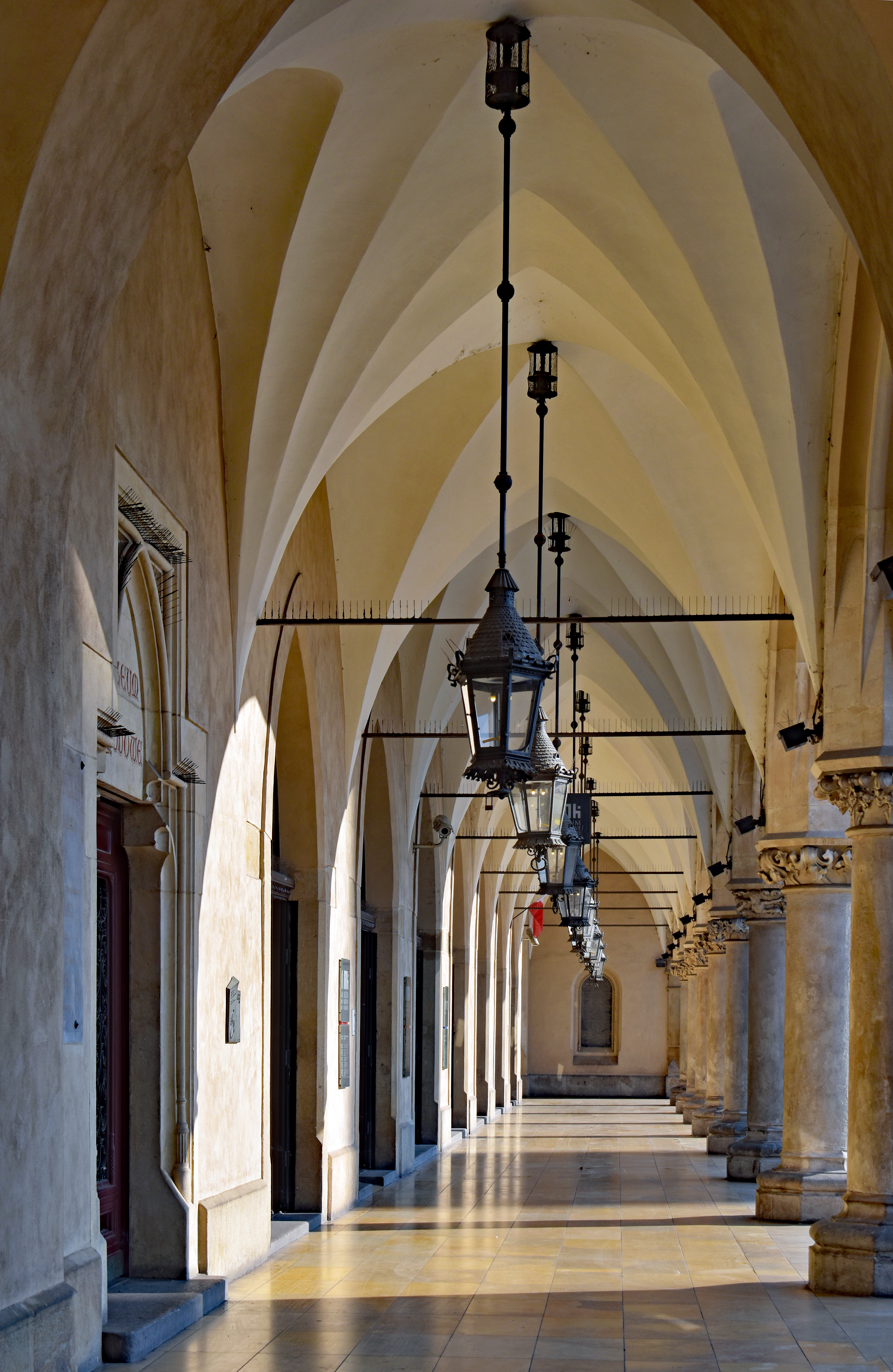
Arcades of the Cloth Hall (1875, with Jan Matejko)
Kraków, 3 Main Market Square

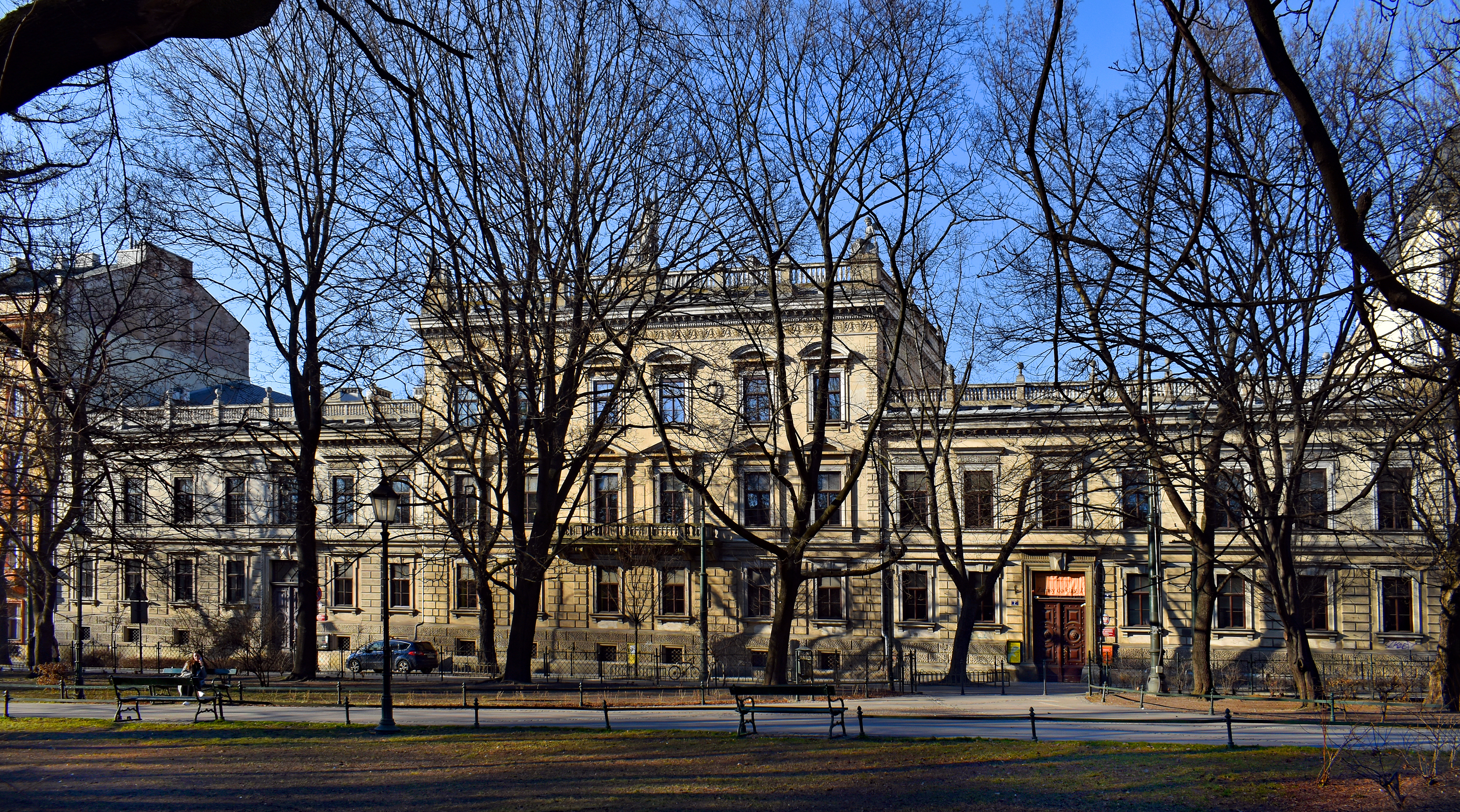
Building of former Insurance Company Florianka (1879)
Kraków, 6-8 Basztowa Street

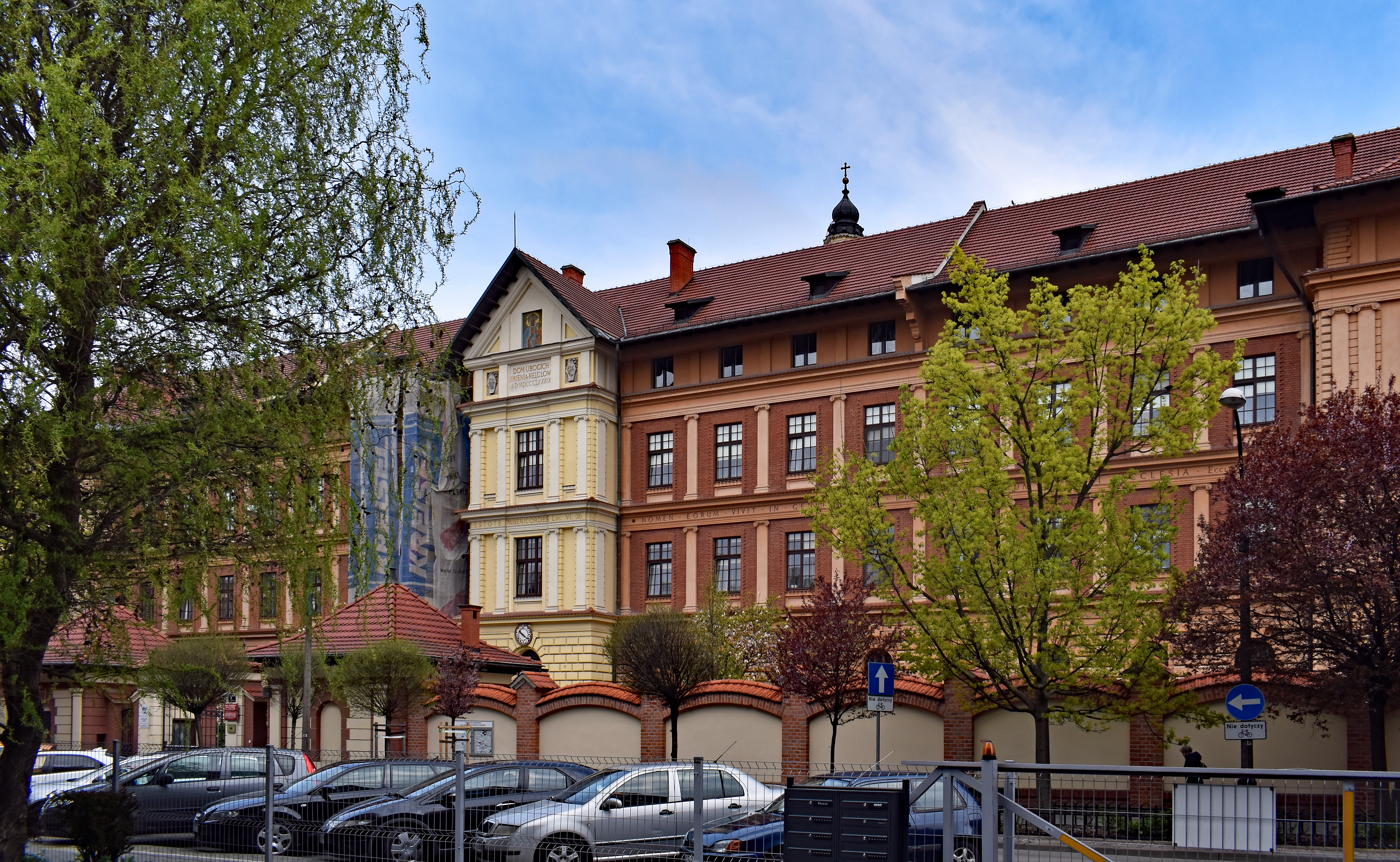
Helcel Nursing Home (1884)
Kraków, 2 Helclów Street

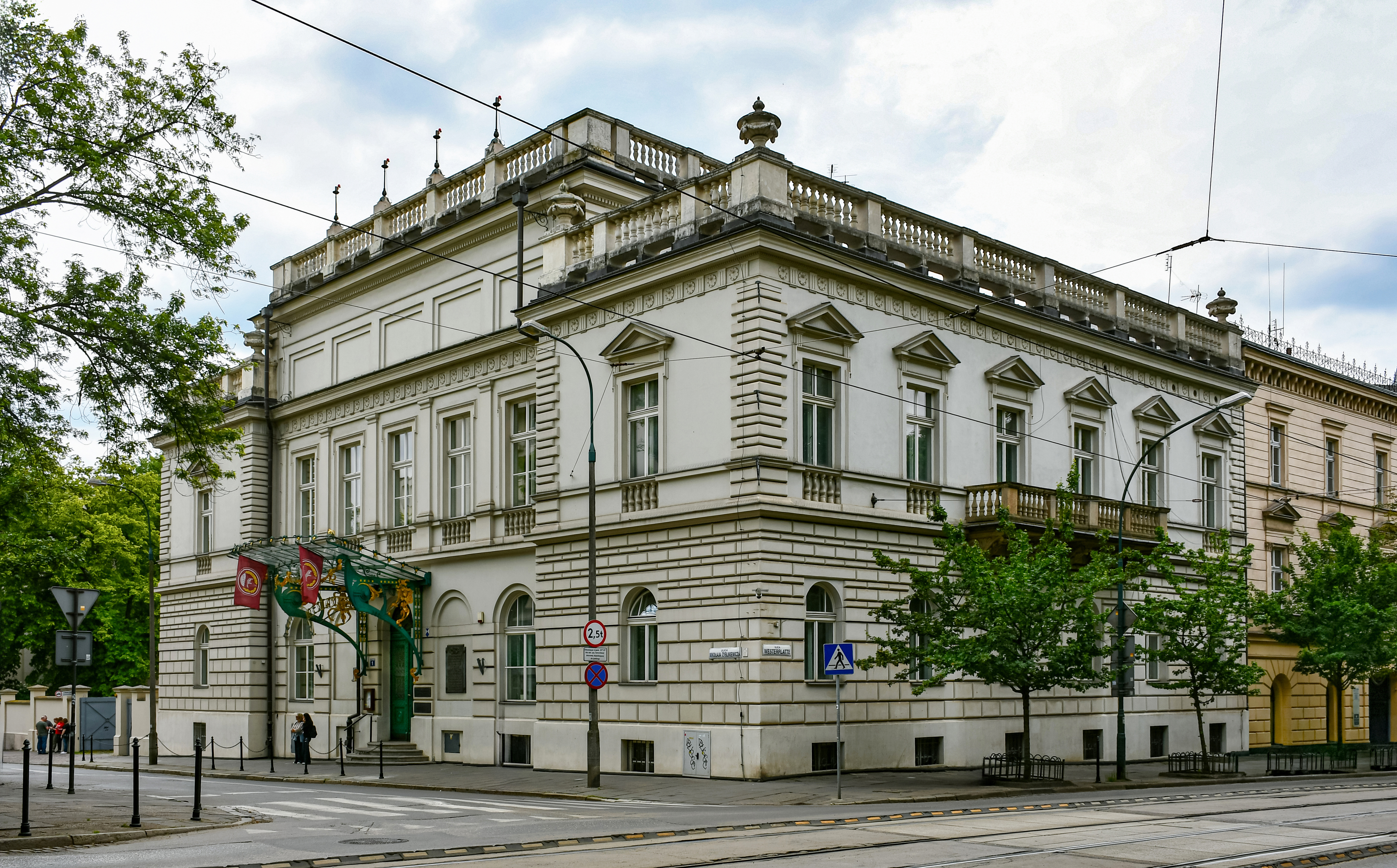
Military officers' casino (1889)
Kraków, 1 Zyblikiewicza Street

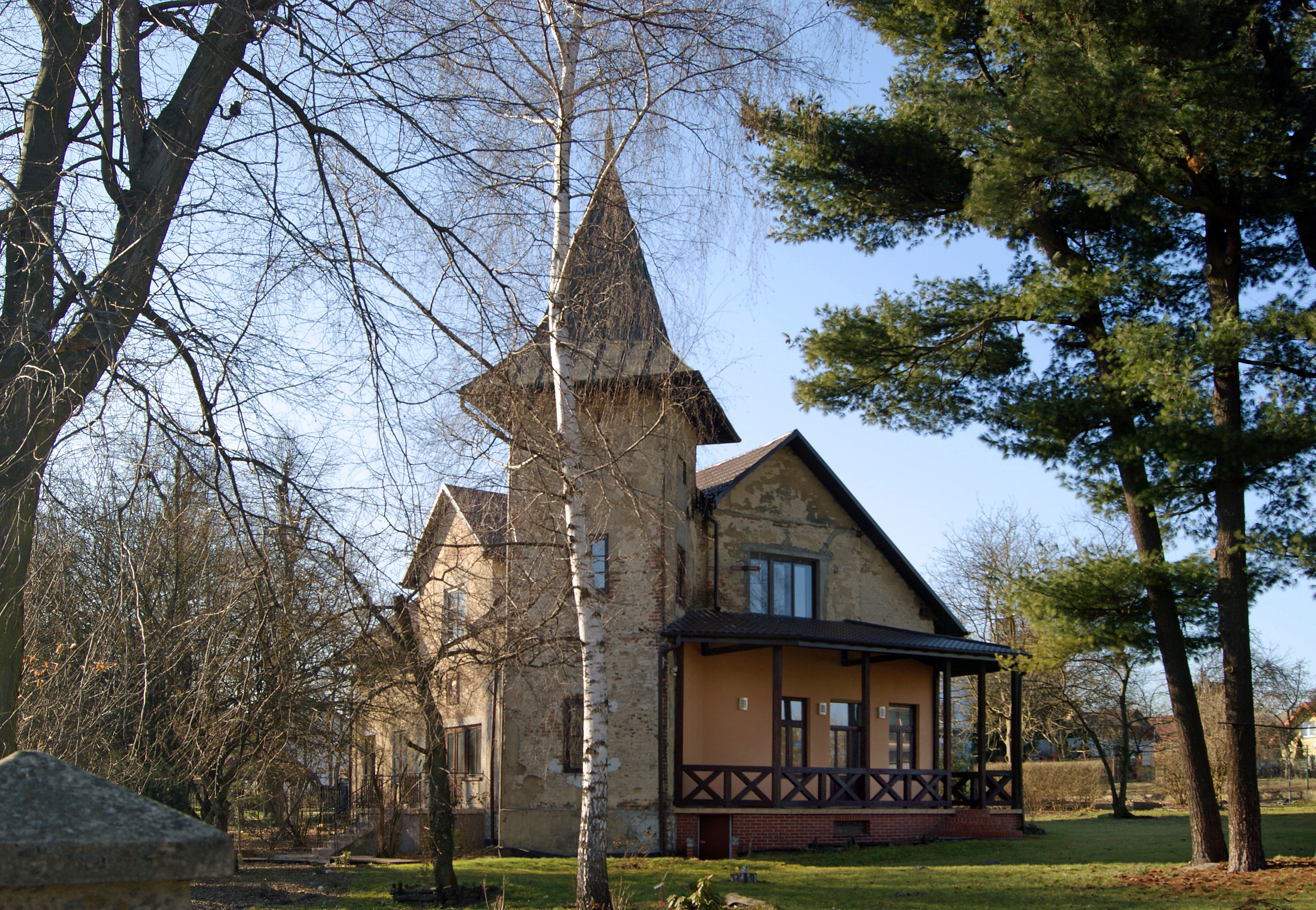
Domański family house (1896)
Rudawa
