= Church of St. Francis de Sales, Kraków =

Roman Catholic church in Kraków, Poland

Church of St. Francis de Sales
- Kościół św. Franciszka Salezego
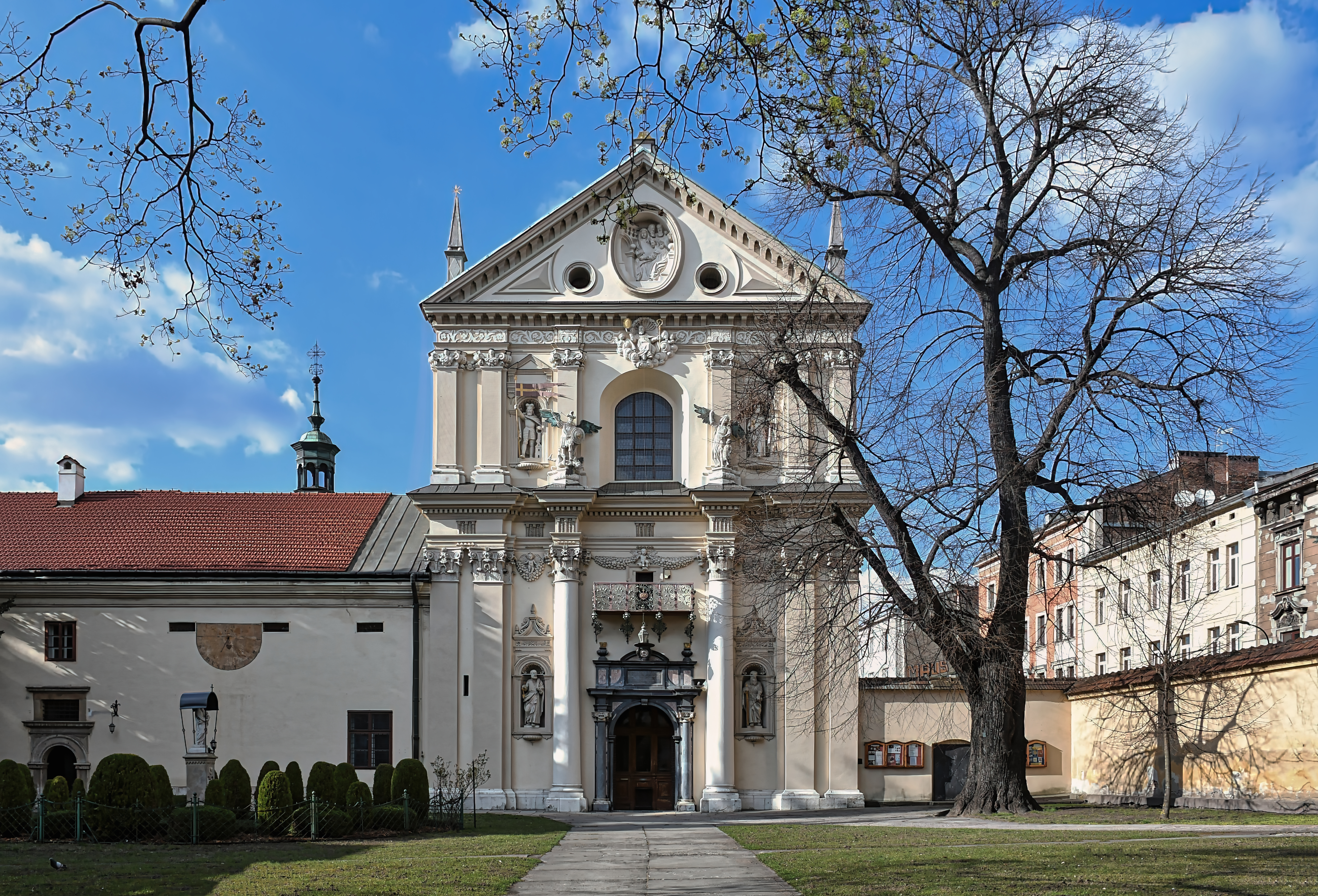
- Church, monastery of the Visitation Sisters and sundial
- Church of St. Francis de Sales
- 50°04′06″N 19°56′13″E
- Location: Kraków
- Address: 16 Krowoderska Street
- Country: Poland
- Denomination: Roman Catholic
- Website: https://www.wizytki.pl/kosciol

History
- Consecrated: 1695

Historic Monument of Poland
- Designated: 1994-09-08
- Part of: Kraków historical city complex
- Reference no.: M.P. 1994 nr 50 poz. 418

The Church of St. Francis de Sales (Polish: Kościół św. Franciszka Salezego), known colloquially as the Visitation Sisters Church (Polish: Kościół wizytek) is a historic Roman Catholic conventual church of the Visitation Sisters located at 16 Krowoderska Street in Piasek, the former district of Kraków, Poland.

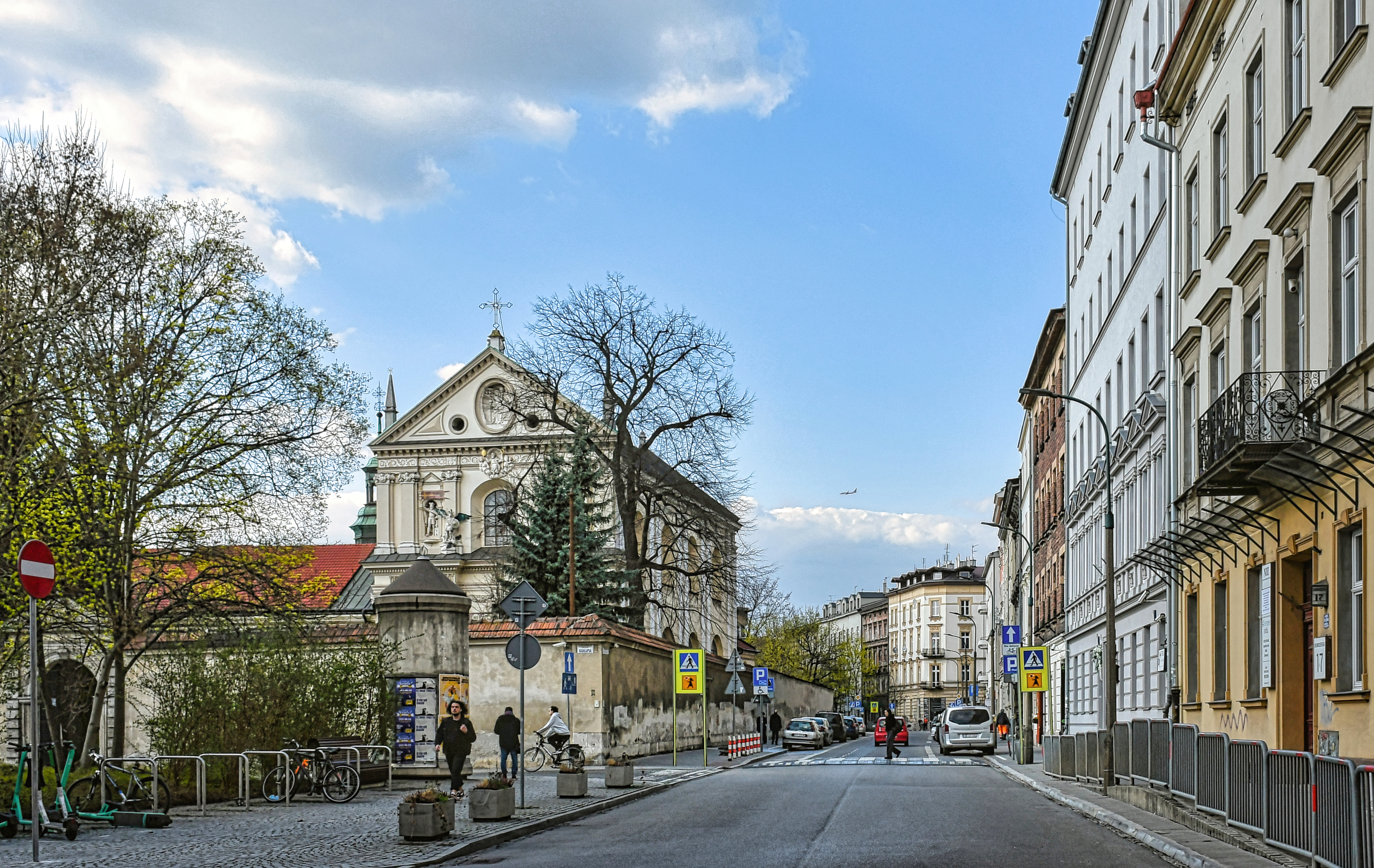
Krowoderska Street, church and monastery

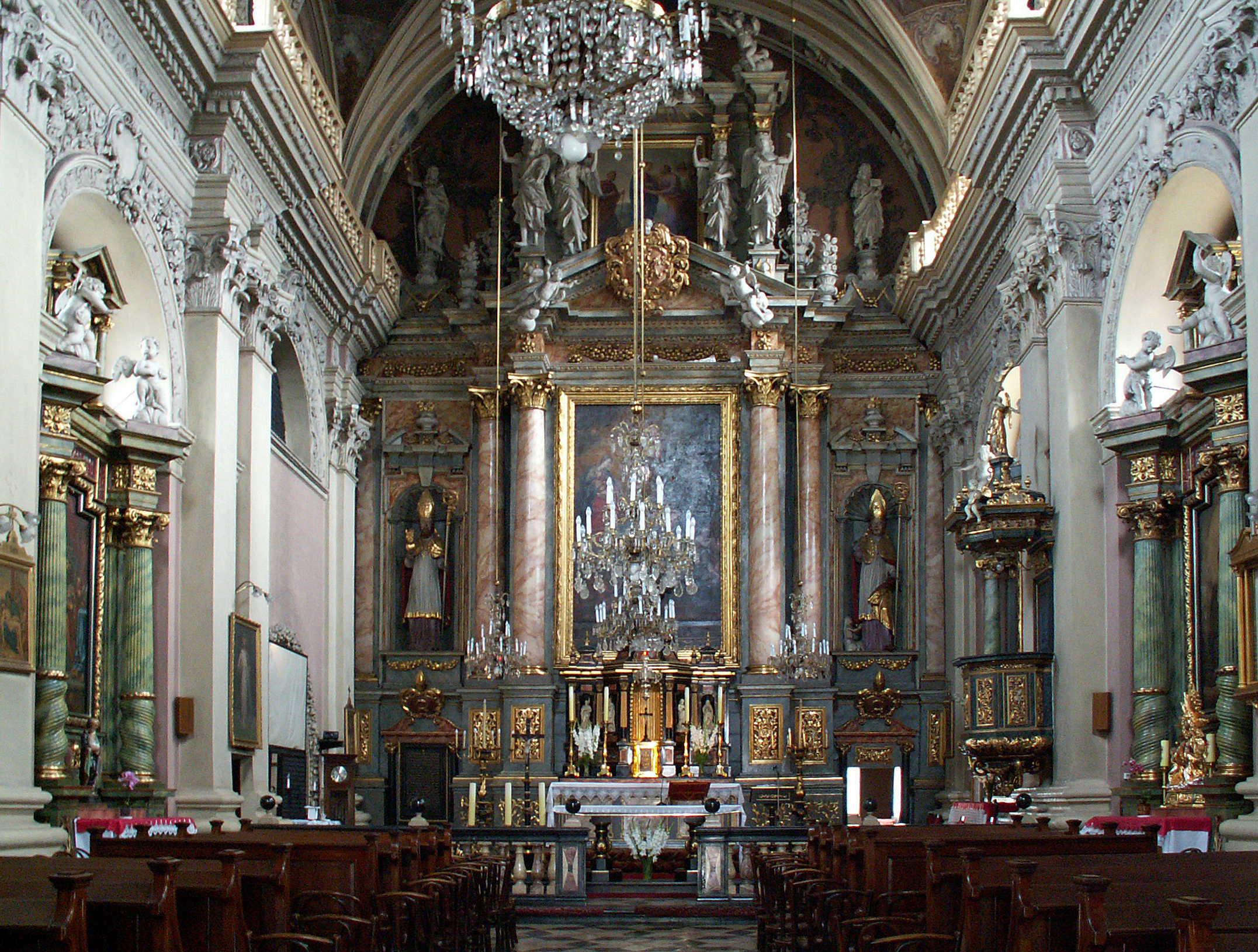
Interior of the church

== Bibliography ==
- (in Polish) Michał Rożek, Barbara Gądkowa Leksykon kościołów Krakowa, Wydawnictwo Verso, Kraków 2003, ISBN 83-919281-0-1 pp. 50-51 (Lexicon of Kraków churches)
- (in Polish) Praca zbiorowa Encyklopedia Krakowa, wydawca Biblioteka Kraków i Muzeum Krakowa, Kraków 2023, ISBN 978-83-66253-46-9 volume I page 743 (Encyclopedia of Kraków)
