= Mikołaj Zyblikiewicz =

Polish politician and lawyer (1823–1887)

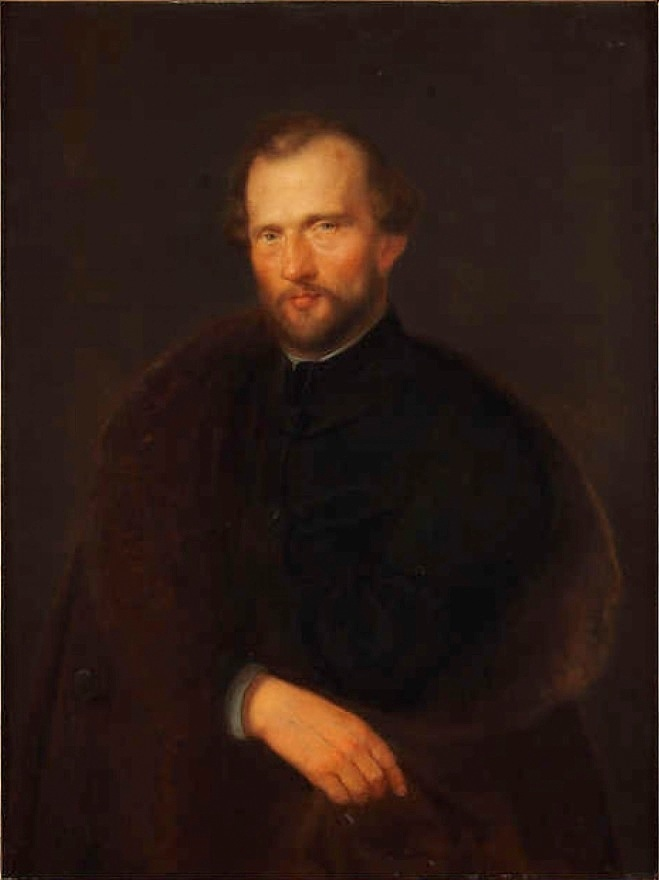

Mayor of Kraków
- In office 2 July 1874 – 7 February 1881
- Preceded by: Józef Dietl

Personal details
- Born: 28 November 1823 Staryi Sambir, Kingdom of Galicia and Lodomeria, Austrian Empire
- Died: 16 May 1887 (aged 63) Kraków, Grand Duchy of Kraków, Austria-Hungary
- Education: Jagiellonian University
- Profession: Lawyer

Mikołaj Zyblikiewicz (Polish: [miˈkɔwaj zɨbliˈkʲɛvit͡ʂ]; Ukrainian: Миколай Зиблікевич; 28 November 1823 – 16 May 1887) was a Polish politician and lawyer of Ruthenian origin. He was the two-term Mayor of Kraków – in the then Grand Duchy of Kraków (part of the Austrian sector of Partitioned Poland). A street in Kraków's Old Town is named in his memory, while his monument stands in front of the City Hall.

Some of his achievements included the restoration of Sukiennice, the creation of a "national Panthéon" at Skałka, and his campaign towards the renovation of Wawel Castle.

== Career ==
Mikołaj Zyblikiewicz was the son of Szymon Zyblikiewicz, a furrier of Ruthenian background in the town of Stare Miasto near Sambor (now Stary Sambir in western Ukraine); he would later self-identify as "gente Ruthenus, natione Polonus". After graduating from high-school in Lviv, he enrolled at the Lviv University while working as a home tutor for local nobility. His political activism began during the Spring of Nations when he joined a series of patriotic Polish youth organizations, and with other young intellectuals (including Platon Kostecki and Jan Dobrzański), became involved with advocacy of Polish national and political rights in the province of Galicia. He moved to Tarnów where he worked at the city high school. He relocated to Krakow soon after to continue his studies at the Faculty of Law in the Jagiellonian University with the aim of attaining a doctorate, and eventually securing a career as a politician.

In 1855, Zyblikiewicz obtained the license of an attorney in Kraków and opened his own law firm at ul. Kopernika 14 Street. In the 1850s, Zyblikiewicz began his first large-scale political action. It was a legal battle with the German language imposed in the Polish offices and courts by the Austrian Empire. He took part in parallel academic action as well (organized by local students), demanding the restoration of the Polish language at the Jagiellonian University. When Józef Dietl resigned from the post of president of the city, after the turbulent elections he was declared the President of Kraków in 1874. He was subsequently instrumental in the foundation of Bank Krajowy.

== Political influence ==
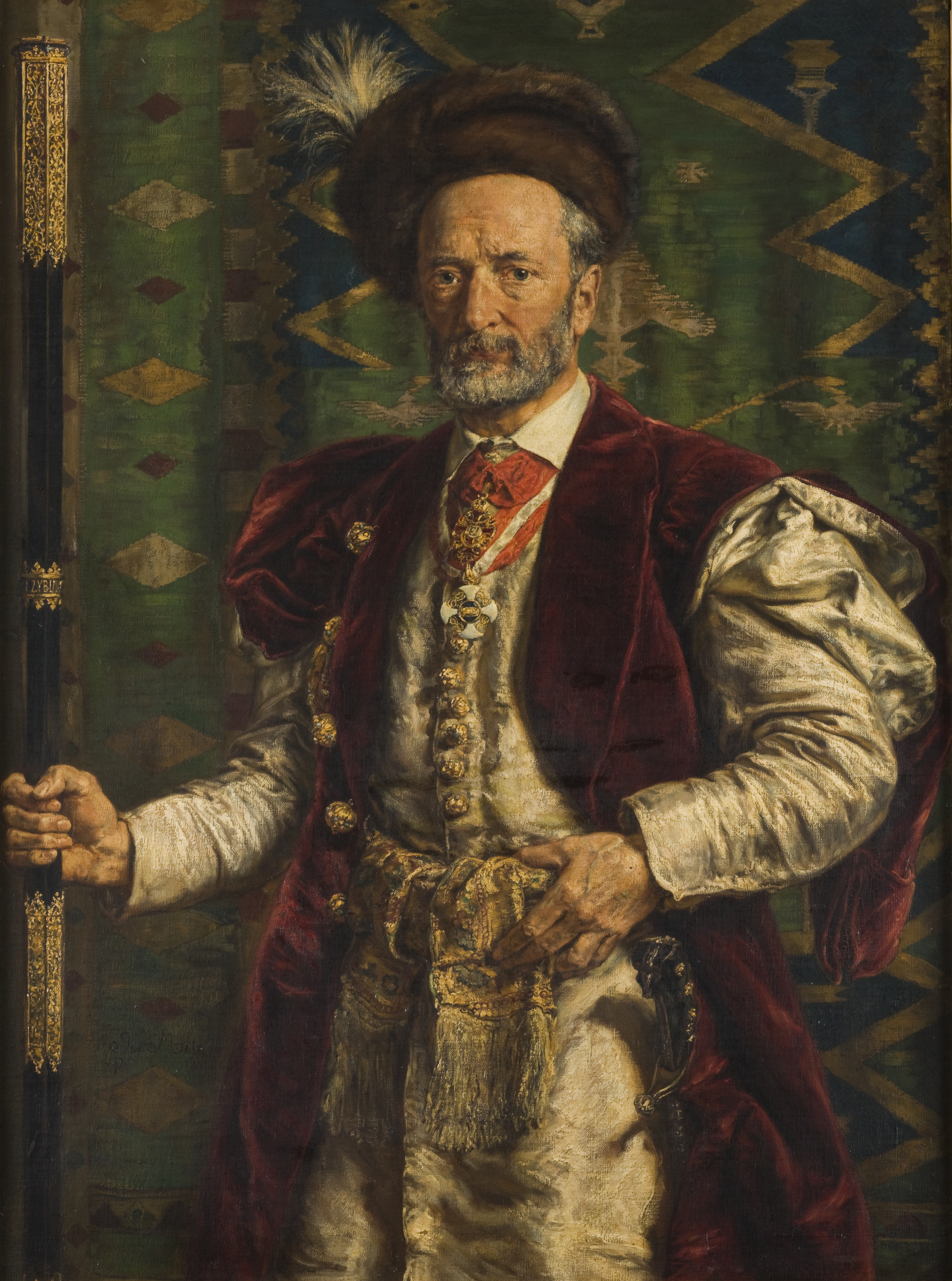
Portrait of Mikołaj Zyblikiewicz by Jan Matejko

During his presidency, Zyblikiewicz reorganized and greatly improved municipal operations. He cut through Austro-Hungarian bureaucratic red-tape, and introduced an increase in his employees' salaries. He contributed to the revival of construction, helped erect new schools, fire station and municipal slaughterhouse. He monitored the construction of a railway viaduct over the Lubicz Street for the Kraków Central station modernized in 1871. He filled-in the northern arm of the Vistula River, which used to separate the district of Kazimierz from the Old Town. His contribution to housing development fundamentally changed the appearance of the city's outer limits.

Zyblikiewicz initiated the construction of new apartment buildings at both ends of Planty Park: at ul. Karmelicka and at Wawel. He established favorable conditions for the building of a new Academy of Fine Arts in Kraków at Kleparz, across the street from Barbakan. He followed up on the vision of his predecessor Józef Dietl, embarking in 1877 on the restoration of Sukiennice Cloth Hall with the national Sukiennice Museum upstairs based on a design by Tomasz Pryliński; it was founded on 3 October 1879. One of his important projects was the creation of a "national Panthéon" at Skałka.

Zyblikiewicz was re-elected president of the city in 1880, and met with Franz Joseph I (Note: Emperor of Austria, King of Bohemia, King of Croatia, Apostolic King of Hungary, King of Galicia and Lodomeria and Grand Duke of Cracow.) when he arrived with a visit to Kraków in September. He petitioned the emperor to save the royal Wawel Castle serving as military outpost for the army, and acquired his approval by offering to make Wawel his future residence, a campaign which became the first step towards the restoration of this traditional seat of the Polish monarchs. In 1881, he was elected member of the Diet and Sejm Marshal of Partitioned Poland, and served until 1886. Zyblikiewicz temporarily moved to Lviv and introduced a broad plan for the economic revival of the Galician province largely abandoned by Imperial Vienna. In gratitude, a street was named after him in Lviv in 1886; however, it was liquidated in 1950 by Soviet Ukraine under Stalin. He helped finish the Pieniny Road across the Tatra mountains from Szczawnica to Červený Kláštor in Slovakia, built for a decade with private funds.

Zyblikiewicz died in Kraków of pneumonia in 1887, and was buried at Rakowicki Cemetery, where a tall obelisk is erected to his honor.
