= Small Weigh House =

Former structure in Kraków, Poland

Coordinates: 50.0610°N 19.9372°E

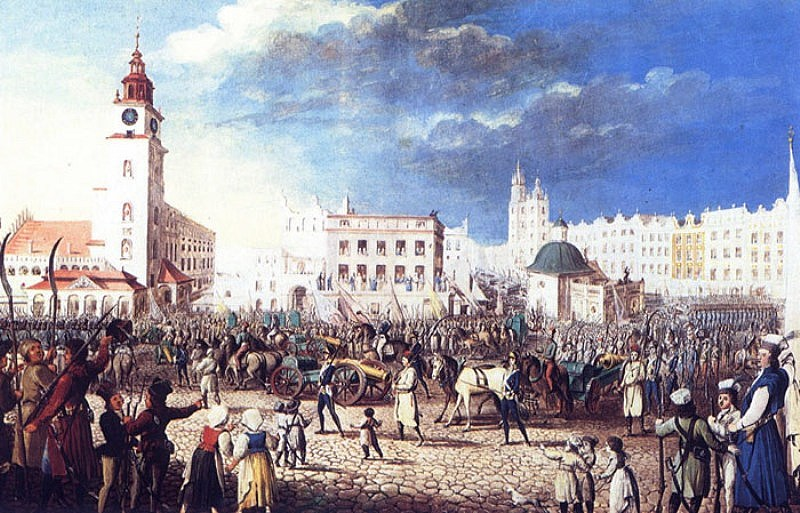
The Small Weigh House, Poland

The Small Weigh House (Polish: Mała Waga Miejska) is a former structure that existed on the main square of Kraków, Poland. It was located in between the cloth hall and Church of St. Adalbert. Next to it was the Great Weigh House.

It was a public building in which smaller goods such as soap and resin were weighed. As public control of the weight of goods was crucial, it was run by the local authorities who would use the weights for the levying of taxes on goods transported through or sold within the city.

The first information about the existence of the Small Weigh in Kraków dates from the year 1358, but it is difficult to verify whether the original location of this building coincides with the location of the one on the main square.

The building's layout had a rectangular shape with the dimensions of 26.5 x 11.7 metres. During the Renaissance, the building was rebuilt probably by Gasparo Arcani de Mesco, who crowned the attic in the Renaissance style, with coats of arms of the king and the characters Samson, Darius, Xerxes and Scipio. In the years 1748-1749 the building was reinforced with a buttress. However the importance of the weigh houses diminished and it was probably demolished in first half of the 19th century.

The foundations of the weigh houses were excavated in the early 21st century and incorporated into an underground museum.

== See also ==
- Kraków Town Hall
