= List of the Marshals of the Sejm =

This is a list of Sejm Marshals, or Speakers of the Sejm (the Lower house of the Polish Parliament) since its establishment as a regular convening body in the late 15th century, until now.

== Kingdom of Poland (1547–1569) ==
| № | Name (Birth–Death) | Tenure | | | Sejm |
| № | Name (Birth–Death) | Start | End | Duration | Sejm |
|---|---|---|---|---|---|
| 1 | Stanisław Podlodowski (Note: Presumed, most probable officeholder.) (d. 1550) | 10 December 1547 | 31 January 1548 | 53 days | in Piotrków |
| 2 | Jan Sierakowski (c. 1498–1589) | 31 October 1548 | 11 November 1548 | 12 days | in Piotrków |
| 3 | Mikołaj Sienicki (c. 1520–1581) | 15 May 1550 | 26 July 1550 | 73 days | in Piotrków |
| 4 | Rafał Leszczyński (c. 1526–1592) | 2 February 1552 | 9 April 1552 | 68 days | in Piotrków |
| 5 | Mikołaj Sienicki (c. 1520–1581) | 1 February 1553 | 29 March 1553 | 57 days | in Kraków |
| 5 | Mikołaj Sienicki (c. 1520–1581) | 22 April 1555 | 15 June 1555 | 55 days | in Piotrków |
| 5 | Mikołaj Sienicki (c. 1520–1581) | 6 December 1556 | 14 January 1557 | 40 days | in Warsaw |
| 5 | Mikołaj Sienicki (c. 1520–1581) | 5 December 1558 | 8 February 1559 | 66 days | in Piotrków |
| 6 | Rafał Leszczyński (c. 1526–1592) | 30 November 1562 | 25 March 1563 | 116 days | in Piotrków |
| 7 | Mikołaj Sienicki (c. 1520–1581) | 22 November 1563 | 1 April 1564 | 132 days | in Warsaw |
| 7 | Mikołaj Sienicki (c. 1520–1581) | 18 January 1565 | 14 April 1565 | 87 days | in Piotrków |
| 8 | Stanisław Sędziwój Czarnkowski (1526–1602) | 10 January 1569 | 12 August 1569 | 215 days | in Lublin |

== Polish–Lithuanian Commonwealth ==
- Mikołaj Sienicki
- Lew Sapieha
- Jakub Szczawiński
- Krzysztof Wiesiołowski
- Aleksander Korwin Gosiewski
- Jakub Sobieski
- Stefan Pac
- Jerzy Ossoliński
- Krzysztof Radziwiłł
- Mikołaj Ostroróg
- Kazimierz Leon Sapieha
- Łukasz Opaliński
- Bogusław Leszczyński
- Jerzy Sebastian Lubomirski
- Hieronim Radziejowski
- Wincenty Aleksander Gosiewski
- Andrzej Maksymilian Fredro
- Krzysztof Zygmunt Pac
- Jan Kazimierz Umiastowski
- Michał Kazimierz Radziwiłł
- Jan Wielopolski
- Jan Chryzostom Pieniążek
- Feliks Kazimierz Potocki
- Stanisław Herakliusz Lubomirski
- Mikołaj Hieronim Sieniawski
- Hieronim Augustyn Lubomirski
- Stanisław Antoni Szczuka
- Krzysztof Zawisza
- Jan Szembek
- Michał Serwacy Wiśniowiecki
- Stanisław Ernest Denhoff
- Franciszek Maksymilian Ossoliński
- Teodor Lubomirski
- Michał Józef Massalski
- Wacław Rzewuski
- Tadeusz Franciszek Ogiński
- Antoni Benedykt Lubomirski
- Adam Kazimierz Czartoryski
- Jacek Małachowski
- Celestyn Czaplic
- Karol Stanisław Radziwiłł
- Michał Hieronim Radziwiłł
- Andrzej Mokronowski
- Kazimierz Krasiński
- Stanisław Małachowski
- Kazimierz Nestor Sapieha

== Partitioned Poland (1795–1918) ==
=== Duchy of Warsaw ===
| № | Name (Birth–Death) | Portrait | Tenure | | |
| № | Name (Birth–Death) | Portrait | Start | End | Duration |
|---|---|---|---|---|---|
| 1 | Tomasz Adam Ostrowski (1735–1817) | | 9 March 1809 | 24 March 1809 | 16 days |
| 2 | Stanisław Sołtyk (1752–1833) | | 11 December 1811 | 27 December 1811 | 17 days |
| 3 | Adam Kazimierz Czartoryski (1734–1823) | | 23 June 1812 | 28 June 1812 | 6 days |

=== Congress Poland ===
| № | Name (Birth–Death) | Portrait | Tenure | | |
| № | Name (Birth–Death) | Portrait | Start | End | Duration |
|---|---|---|---|---|---|
| 1 | Wincenty Krasiński (1782–1858) | | 27 March 1818 | 27 April 1818 | 32 days |
| 2 | Rajmund Hiacynt Rembieliński (1774–1841) | | 13 September 1820 | 13 October 1820 | 31 days |
| 3 | Stanisław Piwnicki (1787–1840) | | 13 May 1825 | 13 June 1825 | 32 days |
| 4 | Józef Gabriel Lubowidzki (1788–1871) | | 28 May 1830 | 28 June 1830 | 32 days |
| 5 | Władysław Tomasz Ostrowski (1790–1869) | | 18 December 1830 | 23 September 1831 | 280 days |

=== Diet of Galicia and Lodomeria ===
| No | Name | Sejm | Period |
|---|---|---|---|
| 1 | Leon Sapieha | I II III | 1861–1875 |
| 2 | Alfred Józef Potocki | III | 1875 |
| 3 | Włodzimierz Dzieduszycki | III | 1876 |
| 4 | Ludwik Wodzicki | IV | 1877-80 |
| 5 | Mikołaj Zyblikiewicz | IV V | 1881-86 |
| 6 | Jan Dzierżysław Tarnowski | V VI | 1886-90 |
| 7 | Eustachy Stanisław Sanguszko | VI | 1890-95 |
| 8 | Stanisław Marcin Badeni | VII | 1895-1901 |
| 9 | Andrzej Potocki | VIII | 1901-02 |
| (8) | Stanisław Marcin Badeni | VIII IX | 1903-12 |
| 10 | Adam Gołuchowski | X | 1913-14 |
| 11 | Stanisław Niezabitowski | X | 1914-18 |

== Second Polish Republic (1919–1939) ==
| № | Name (Birth–Death) | Portrait | Political affiliation | Term of office | | | Sejm |
| № | Name (Birth–Death) | Portrait | Political affiliation | Start | End | Duration | Sejm |
|---|---|---|---|---|---|---|---|
| 1 | Wojciech Trąmpczyński (1860–1953) | | Independent | 14 February 1919 | 27 November 1922 (Note: The term formally lasted until 1 December 1922, when the 1st term Sejm became legitimate after it elected its Marshal, which was a prerequisition of the provisions on transitional period. The last sitting of the Legislative Sejm took place on 27 November 1922. The 1st term Sejm convenied from 28 November 1922 under the Senior Marshal, a pro tempore presiding officer.) | 3 years, 287 days | Legislative |
| 2 | Maciej Rataj (1884–1940) | | Polish People's Party "Piast" | 1 December 1922 | 28 November 1927 | 4 years, 338 days | 1st |
| 3 | Ignacy Daszyński (1866–1936) | | Polish Socialist Party | 27 March 1928 | 30 August 1930 | 2 years, 157 days | 2nd |
| 4 | Kazimierz Świtalski (1886–1962) | | BBWR | 9 December 1930 | 10 July 1935 | 4 years, 214 days | 3rd |
| 5 | Stanisław Car (1882–1938) | | BBWR (Note: Until 30 October 1935, when the Bloc was dissolved.) | 4 October 1935 | 18 June 1938 | 2 years, 258 days | 4th |
| 6 | Walery Sławek (1879–1939) | | Independent | 22 June 1938 | 13 September 1938 | 84 days | 4th |
| 7 | Wacław Makowski (1880–1942) | | Camp of National Unity | 24 November 1938 | 2 November 1939 | 344 days | 5th |

== Communist era (1947–1991) ==
| № | Name (Birth–Death) | Portrait | Party | Term of office | | | Sejm |
| № | Name (Birth–Death) | Portrait | Party | Start | End | Duration | Sejm |
|---|---|---|---|---|---|---|---|
| 1 | Władysław Kowalski (1894–1958) | | People's Party | 4 February 1947 | 20 November 1952 | 5 years, 291 days | Legislative |
| 1 | Władysław Kowalski (1894–1958) | | United People's Party | 4 February 1947 | 20 November 1952 | 5 years, 291 days | Legislative |
| 2 | Jan Dembowski (1889–1963) | | Independent | 20 November 1952 | 20 November 1956 | 4 years, 0 days | 1st |
| 3 | Czesław Wycech (1899–1977) | | United People's Party | 20 February 1957 | 20 February 1961 | 4 years, 0 days | 2nd |
| 3 | Czesław Wycech (1899–1977) | | United People's Party | 15 May 1961 | 16 April 1965 | 3 years, 336 days | 3rd |
| 3 | Czesław Wycech (1899–1977) | | United People's Party | 24 June 1965 | 30 May 1969 | 3 years, 340 days | 4th |
| 3 | Czesław Wycech (1899–1977) | | United People's Party | 27 June 1969 | 13 February 1971 | 1 year, 232 days | 5th |
| 4 | Dyzma Gałaj (1915–2000) | | United People's Party | 13 February 1971 | 15 February 1972 | 1 year, 2 days | 5th |
| 5 | Stanisław Gucwa (1919–1994) | | United People's Party | 28 March 1972 | 19 March 1976 | 3 years, 357 days | 6th |
| 5 | Stanisław Gucwa (1919–1994) | | United People's Party | 25 March 1976 | 21 March 1980 | 3 years, 362 days | 7th |
| 5 | Stanisław Gucwa (1919–1994) | | United People's Party | 2 April 1980 | 31 August 1985 | 5 years, 151 days | 8th |
| 6 | Roman Malinowski (1935–2021) | | United People's Party | 6 November 1985 | 3 June 1989 | 3 years, 209 days | 9th |
| 7 | Mikołaj Kozakiewicz (1923–1998) | | United People's Party | 4 July 1989 | 25 November 1991 | 2 years, 144 days | 10th |
| 7 | Mikołaj Kozakiewicz (1923–1998) | | Polish People's Party "Rebirth" | 4 July 1989 | 25 November 1991 | 2 years, 144 days | 10th |
| 7 | Mikołaj Kozakiewicz (1923–1998) | | Polish People's Party | 4 July 1989 | 25 November 1991 | 2 years, 144 days | 10th |

== Republic of Poland (since 1991) ==
In the aftermath of the Round Table Agreement of 1989, the Polish People's Republic was abolished and the modern-day Republic of Poland was established on 31 December 1989 by the constitutional amendment. However, the incumbent term of the Sejm, elected at the 1989 election, remained in position, until parliament dissolution and election of 1991.

| № | Name (Birth–Death) | Portrait | Parliamentary group (party) (Note: When the officeholder's parliamentary group and political party are not one and the same, the party membership is specified in parentheses.) | Constituency | Term of office | | | Sejm |
| № | Name (Birth–Death) | Portrait | Parliamentary group (party) | Constituency | Start | End | Duration | Sejm |
|---|---|---|---|---|---|---|---|---|
| 1 | Wiesław Chrzanowski (1923–2012) | | Christian National Union | 28 (Lublin) | 25 November 1991 | 14 October 1993 | 1 year, 323 days | 1st |
| 2 | Józef Oleksy (1946–2015) | | Democratic Left Alliance (SdRP) | 39 (Siedlce) | 14 October 1993 | 3 March 1995 | 1 year, 140 days | 2nd |
| 3 | Józef Zych (born 1938) | | Polish People's Party | 52 (Zielona Góra) | 3 March 1995 | 20 October 1997 | 2 years, 231 days | 2nd |
| 4 | Maciej Płażyński (1958–2010) | | Solidarity Electoral Action | 11 (Gdańsk) | 20 October 1997 | 18 October 2001 | 3 years, 364 days | 3rd |
| 4 | Maciej Płażyński (1958–2010) | | Independent | 11 (Gdańsk) | 20 October 1997 | 18 October 2001 | 3 years, 364 days | 3rd |
| 5 | Marek Borowski (born 1946) | | Democratic Left Alliance | 19 (Warsaw I) | 19 October 2001 | 20 April 2004 | 2 years, 185 days | 4th |
| 5 | Marek Borowski (born 1946) | | Social Democracy of Poland | 19 (Warsaw I) | 19 October 2001 | 20 April 2004 | 2 years, 185 days | 4th |
| (2); 6 | Józef Oleksy (1946–2015) | | Democratic Left Alliance | 18 (Siedlce) | 21 April 2004 | 5 January 2005 | 260 days | 4th |
| 7 | Włodzimierz Cimoszewicz (born 1950) | | Democratic Left Alliance | 24 (Białystok) | 5 January 2005 | 18 October 2005 | 287 days | 4th |
| 8 | Marek Jurek (born 1960) | | Law and Justice | 10 (Piotrków Trybunalski) | 26 October 2005 | 27 April 2007 | 1 year, 184 days | 5th |
| 8 | Marek Jurek (born 1960) | | Right Wing of the Republic | 10 (Piotrków Trybunalski) | 26 October 2005 | 27 April 2007 | 1 year, 184 days | 5th |
| 9 | Ludwik Dorn (1954–2022) | | Law and Justice | 20 (Warsaw II) | 27 April 2007 | 4 November 2007 | 192 days | 5th |
| 10 | Bronisław Komorowski (born 1952) | | Civic Platform | 20 (Warsaw II) | 5 November 2007 | 8 July 2010 | 2 years, 246 days | 6th |
| 11 | Grzegorz Schetyna (born 1963) | | Civic Platform | 1 (Legnica) | 8 July 2010 | 7 November 2011 | 1 year, 123 days | 6th |
| 12 | Ewa Kopacz (born 1956) | | Civic Platform | 17 (Radom) | 8 November 2011 | 22 September 2014 | 2 years, 319 days | 7th |
| — | Deputy Marshal; Jerzy Wenderlich (born 1954); Acting | | Democratic Left Alliance | 5 (Toruń) | 22 September 2014 | 24 September 2014 | 3 days | 7th |
| 13 | Radosław Sikorski (born 1963) | | Civic Platform | 4 (Bydgoszcz) | 24 September 2014 | 23 June 2015 | 273 days | 7th |
| — | Deputy Marshal; Jerzy Wenderlich (born 1954); Acting | | Democratic Left Alliance | 5 (Toruń) | 23 June 2015 | 25 June 2015 | 3 days | 7th |
| 14 | Małgorzata Kidawa-Błońska (born 1957) | | Civic Platform | 19 (Warsaw I) | 25 June 2015 | 11 November 2015 | 140 days | 7th |
| 15 | Marek Kuchciński (born 1955) | | Law and Justice | 22 (Krosno) | 12 November 2015 | 9 August 2019 | 3 years, 271 days | 8th |
| 16 | Elżbieta Witek (born 1957) | | Law and Justice | 1 (Legnica) | 9 August 2019 | 11 November 2019 | 4 years, 96 days | 8th |
| 16 | Elżbieta Witek (born 1957) | | Law and Justice | 1 (Legnica) | 12 November 2019 | 12 November 2023 | 4 years, 96 days | 9th |
| 17 | Szymon Hołownia (born 1976) | | Poland 2050 | 24 (Białystok) | 13 November 2023 | 18 November 2025 | 2 years, 6 days | 10th |
| 18 | Włodzimierz Czarzasty (born 1960) | | The Left (NL) | 32 (Katowice III) | 18 November 2025 | Incumbent | 119 days | 10th |

== See also ==
- Marshal of the Senate of Poland
