= Kraków Cloth Hall =

Medieval market hall in Kraków Old Town, Poland

Cloth Hall
- Sukiennice
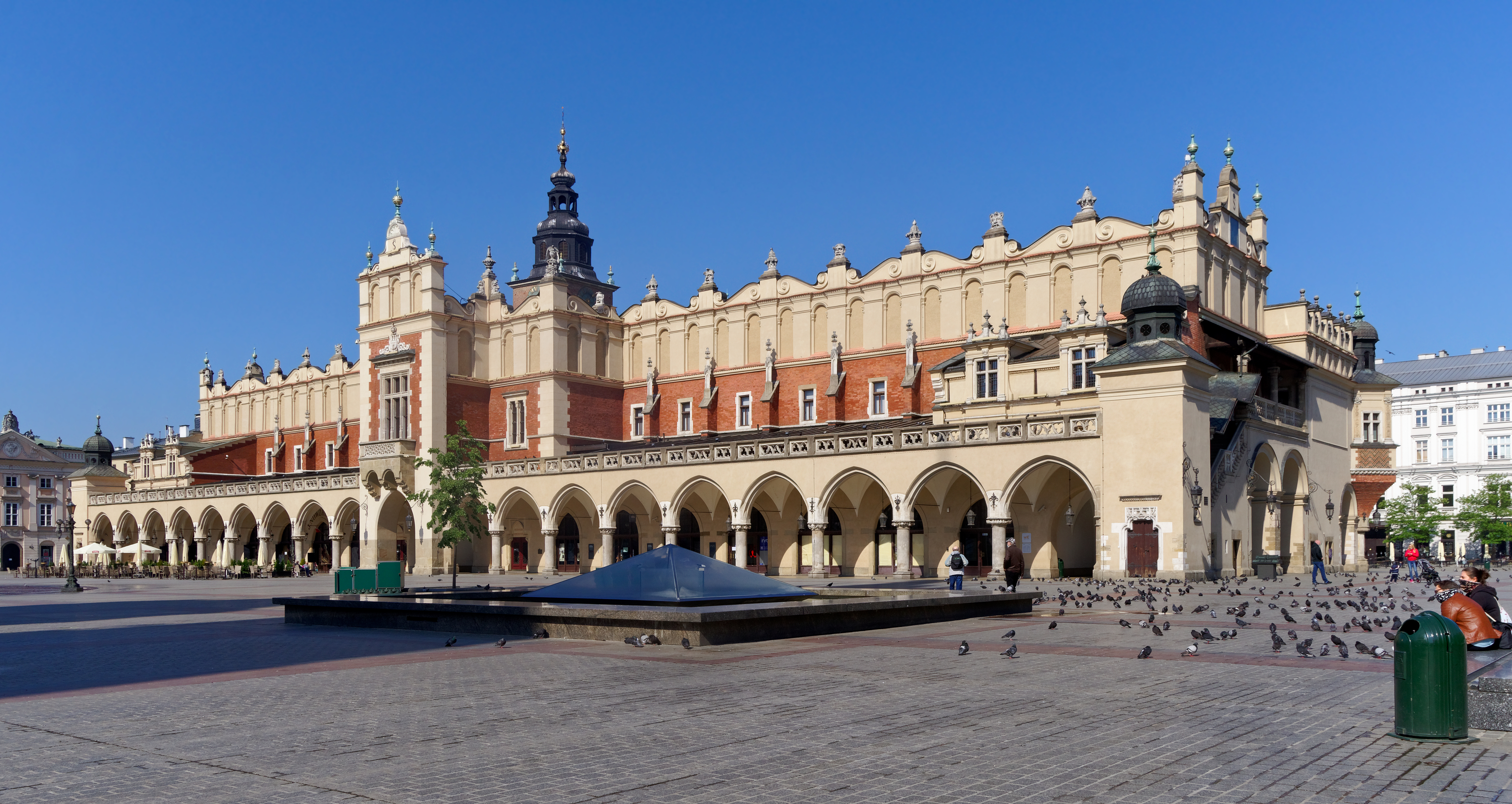
- View from the east

General information
- Type: cloth hall
- Architectural style: Renaissance
- Location: 3 Main Market Square; Kraków; Poland
- Coordinates: 50°03′42″N 19°56′14.4″E
- Completed: 1358, 1559, 1879

UNESCO World Heritage Site
- Type: Cultural
- Criteria: iv
- Designated: 1978
- Part of: Historic Centre of Kraków
- Reference no.: 29bis

Historic Monument of Poland
- Designated: 1994-09-08
- Part of: Kraków historical city complex
- Reference no.: M.P. 1994 nr 50 poz. 418

The Cloth Hall (Polish: Sukiennice, pronounced [sukʲɛˈɲːit͡sɛ]), is a historic cloth hall located in the centre of the Main Market Square in Old Town of Kraków, Poland.

The hall dates to the Renaissance and is one of the city's most recognisable monuments. It is the central feature of the main market square in the Kraków Old Town (the historic center of Kraków), which since 1978 has been listed as a UNESCO World Heritage Site.

== History ==
It was once a major centre of international trade. Travelling merchants met there to discuss business and to barter. During its golden age in the 15th century, the hall was the source of a variety of exotic imports from the east – spices, silk, leather and wax – while Kraków itself exported textiles, lead, and salt from the Wieliczka Salt Mine.

In the immediate vicinity of the hall, the Great Weigh House and the Small Weigh House existed until the 19th century. Other, similar cloth halls have existed in other Polish as well as other European cities such as in Ypres, Belgium; Braunschweig, and in Leeds, England.

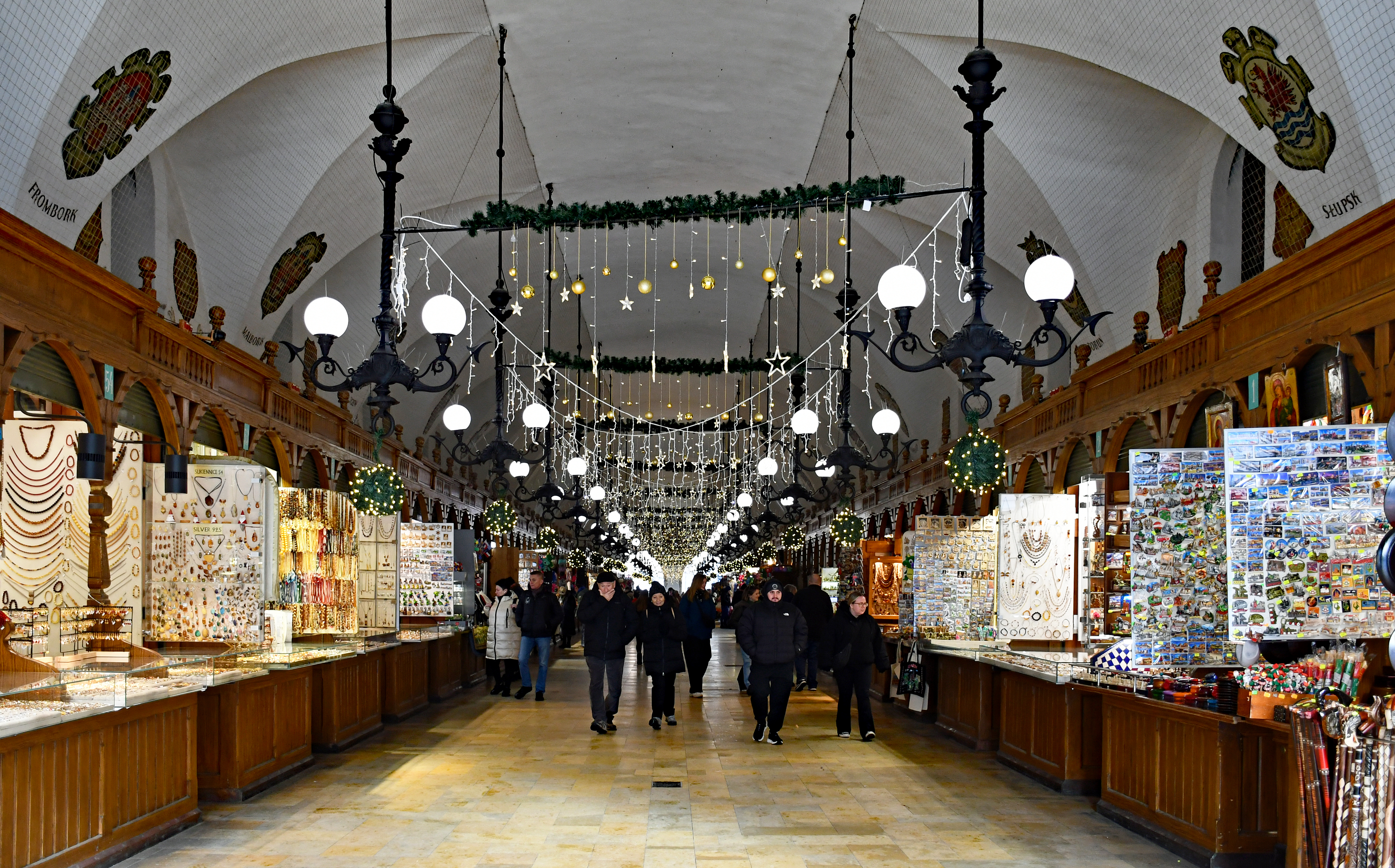
- Gallery, with stalls

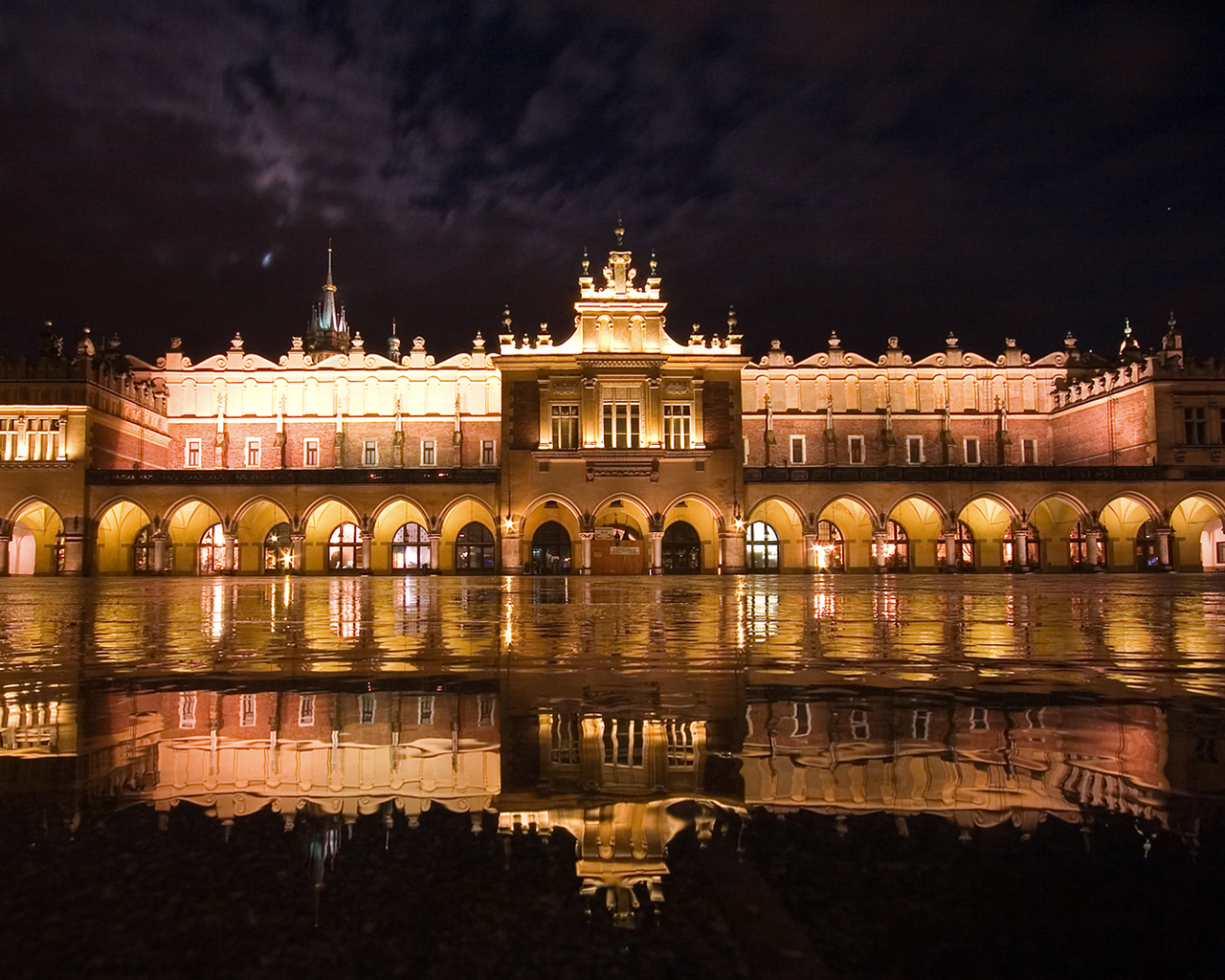
- Sukiennice by night

Kraków was Poland's capital city and was among the largest cities in Europe already from before the time of the Renaissance. However, its decline started with the move of the capital to Warsaw at the end of the 16th century. The city's decline was hastened by wars and politics leading to the Partitions of Poland at the end of the 18th century. By the time of the architectural restoration proposed for the cloth hall in 1870 under Austrian rule, much of the historic city center was decrepit. A change in political and economic fortunes for the Kingdom of Galicia and Lodomeria ushered in a revival due to newly established Legislative Assembly or Sejm of the Land. The successful renovation of the Cloth Hall, based on a design by Tomasz Pryliński and supervised by Mayor Mikołaj Zyblikiewicz, Sejm Marshal, was one of the most notable achievements of this period.

The hall has hosted many distinguished guests over the centuries and is still used to entertain monarchs and dignitaries, such as King Charles III, then Prince of Wales, and Emperor Akihito of Japan, who was welcomed here in 2002. In the past, balls were held here, most notably after Prince Józef Poniatowski had briefly liberated the city from the Austrians in 1809. Aside from its history and cultural value, the hall is still used as a center of commerce.

== Upper-floor museum ==
Sukiennice Museum, upstairs

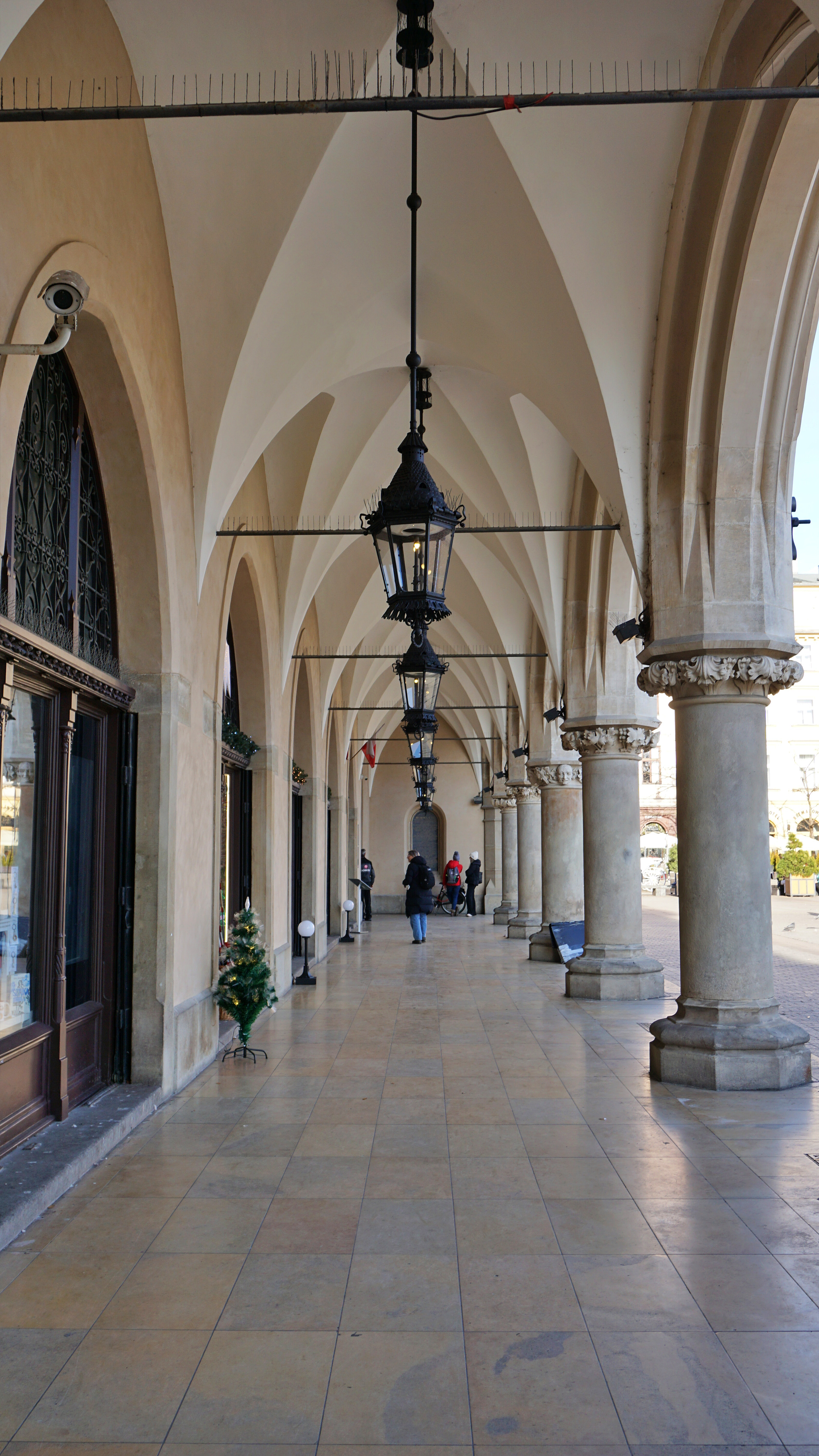
Arcades from the eastern side. There is gas lighting in the central part

On the upper floor of the hall is the Sukiennice Museum division of the National Museum, Kraków. It holds the largest permanent exhibit of 19th-century Polish painting and sculpture, in four grand exhibition halls arranged by historical period and the theme extending into an entire artistic epoch. The museum was upgraded in 2010 with new technical equipment, storerooms, service spaces as well as improved thematic layout for the display.

The Gallery of 19th-Century Polish Art was a major cultural venue from the moment it opened on October 7, 1879. It features late Baroque, Rococo, and Classicist 18th-century portraits and battle scenes by Polish and foreign pre-Romantics; the art of partitioned Poland with famed Prussian Homage by Jan Matejko; mythological and biblical scenes with the monumental Nero's Torches by Henryk Siemiradzki, the art of representative members of Young Poland from the turn of the 20th century including Jacek Malczewski, Józef Chełmoński; prominent impressionists Józef Pankiewicz and Leon Wyczółkowski; paintings by Wojciech Gerson and Julian Fałat, as well as large, and controversial Ecstasy, or Frenzy of Exultations by Władysław Podkowiński among other masterpieces.

== Historical images ==
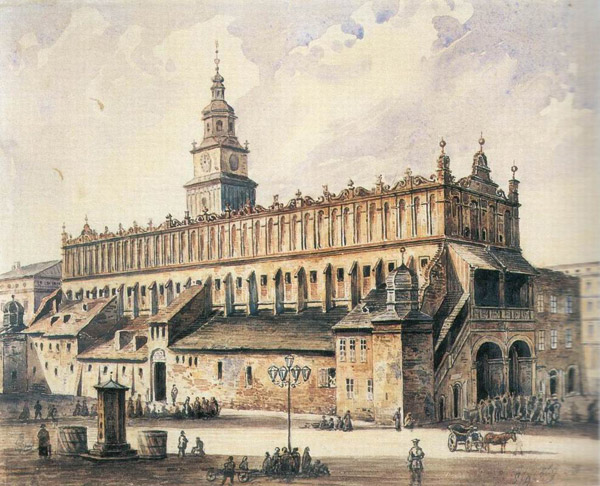
Before 19th-century restoration

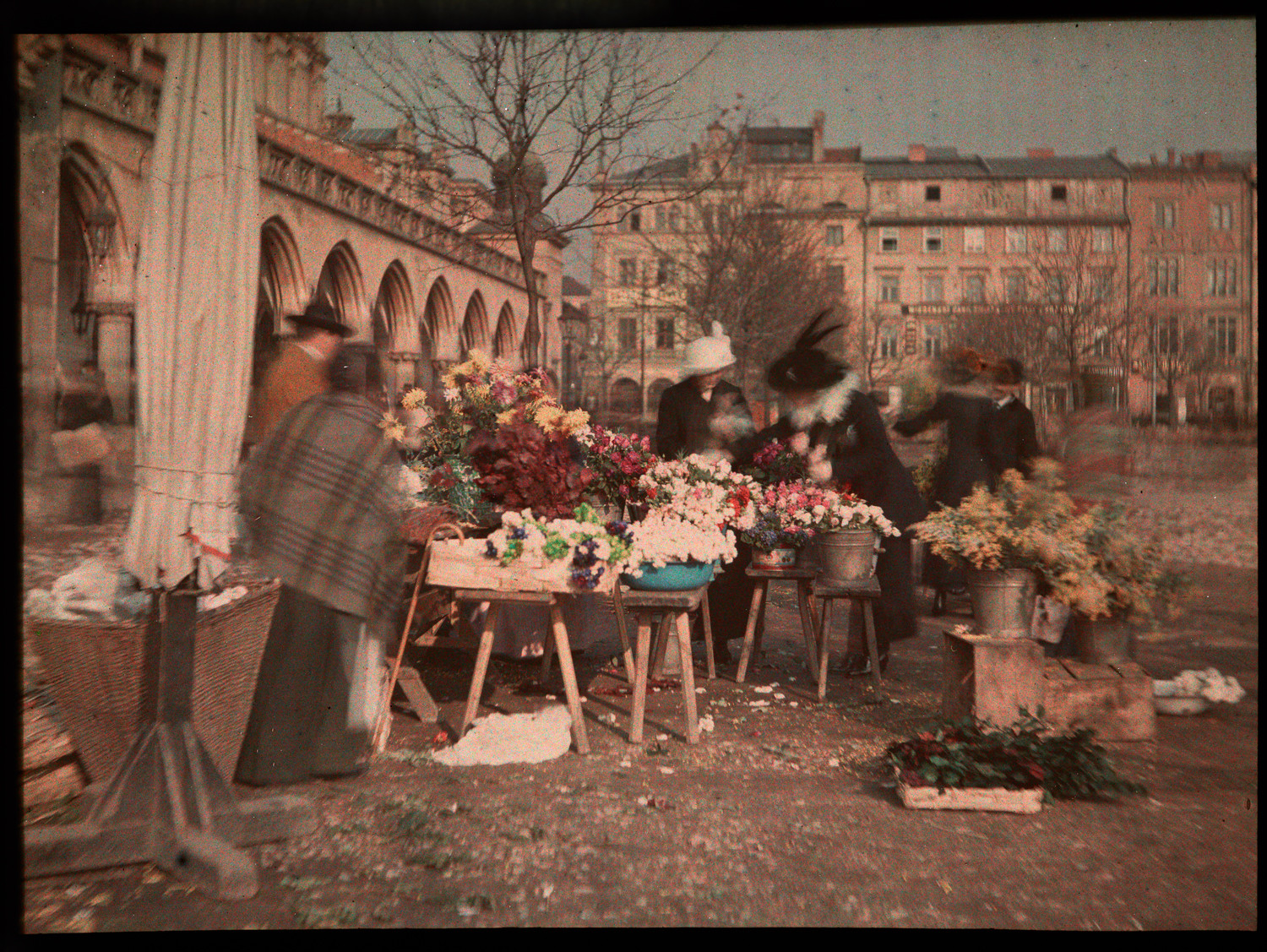
Kraków Cloth Hall in 1915

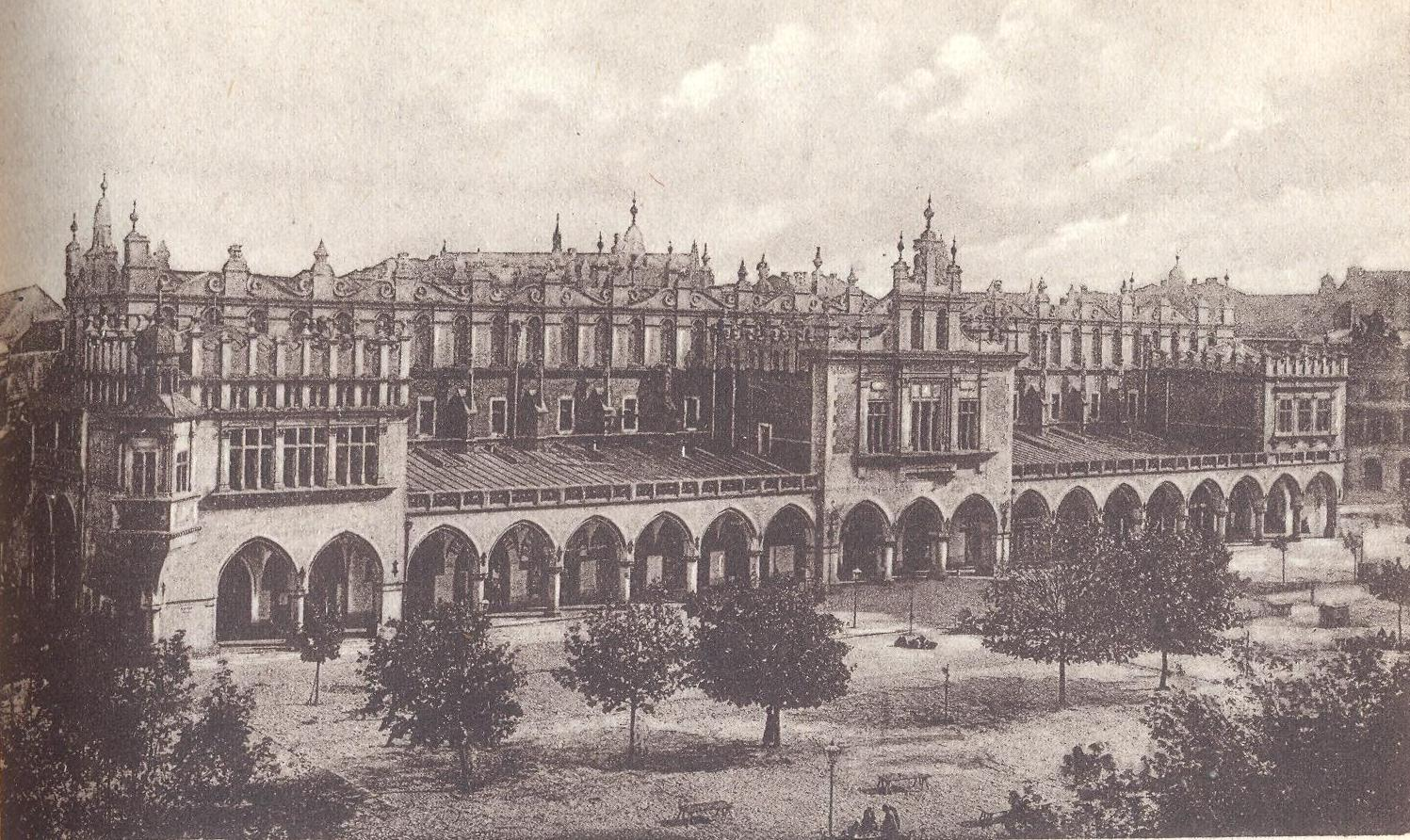
Kraków Cloth Hall in 1930

== See also ==
- Culture of Kraków
- Events in Kraków
