= John of Capistrano =

Patron saint of military chaplains

Saint John of Capistrano O.F.M.
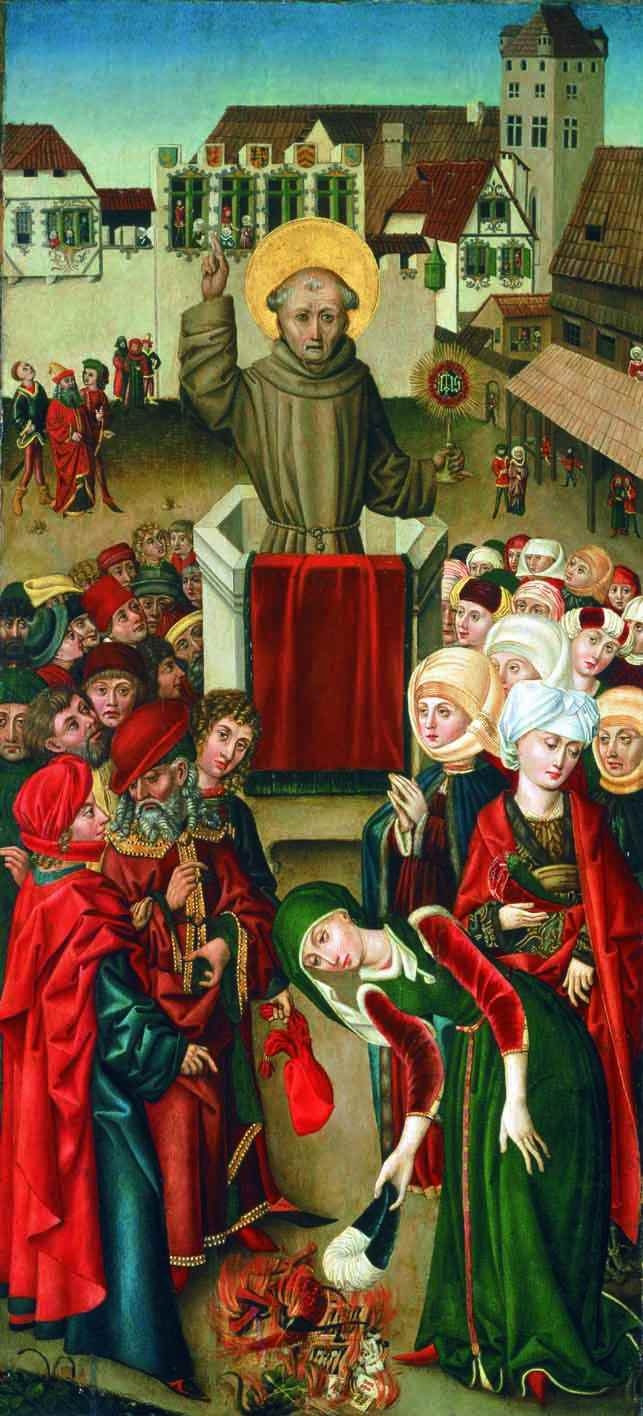
- Illumination depicting St. John of Capistrano (c. 1470)

Confessor
- Born: 24 June 1386; Capestrano, Abruzzi, Kingdom of Naples
- Died: 23 October 1456 (aged 70); Ilok, Syrmia, Kingdom of Hungary
- Venerated in: Roman Catholic Church
- Canonized: 16 October 1690 (Liturgy); 4 June 1724 (Bull), Rome by Pope Alexander VIII and Pope Benedict XIII respectively
- Feast: 23 October; 28 March (General Roman Calendar, 1890–1969)
- Patronage: Jurists, Belgrade and Hungary

John of Capistrano, OFM (Italian: Giovanni da Capestrano; 24 June 1386 – 23 October 1456) was an Italian Franciscan friar and Catholic priest from the town of Capestrano, Abruzzo. Famous as a preacher, theologian, and inquisitor, he earned himself the nickname "the Soldier Saint" when in 1456 at age 70 he led a Crusade against the invading Ottoman Empire at the siege of Belgrade with the Hungarian military commander John Hunyadi.

Elevated to sainthood, he is the patron saint of jurists and military chaplains as well as the namesake of two Franciscan missions, one in Southern California and the other in San Antonio, Texas.

== Early life ==
As was the custom of this time, John is denoted by the village of Capestrano, in the Diocese of Sulmona, in the Abruzzi region, Kingdom of Naples. His father had come to Italy with the Angevin court of Louis I of Anjou, titular King of Naples. He studied law at the University of Perugia.

In 1412, King Ladislaus of Naples appointed him Governor of Perugia, a tumultuous and resentful papal fief held by Ladislas as the pope's champion, in order to effectively establish public order. When war broke out between Perugia and the House of Malatesta in 1416, John was sent as ambassador to broker a peace, but the Malatestas threw him in prison. It was during this imprisonment that he began to study theology. When he was released, he decided to become a Franciscan friar, citing a dream where Saint Francis of Assisi ordered him to enter the Order. He had married before the war, but asserted that the marriage was never consummated and received permission to take holy orders.

== Friar and preacher ==
Together with James of the Marches, John entered the Order of Friars Minor at Perugia on 4 October 1416. Along with James, he studied theology at Fiesole, near Florence, under Bernardine of Siena. He soon gave himself up to the most rigorous asceticism, vigorously defending the ideal of strict observance and insisting on purity of doctrine, following the example set by Bernardine. From 1420 onwards, he preached with great effect in numerous cities and eventually became well known. He was ordained in 1425.

Unlike most Italian preachers of repentance in the 15th century, John was effective in northern and central Europe– in German states of Holy Roman Empire, Bohemia, Moravia, Austria, Hungary, Croatia, and the Kingdom of Poland. Even the largest churches could not hold the crowds that gathered to hear him, so he preached in the public squares; at Brescia in Italy, he preached to a crowd of 126,000.

== Reformer ==
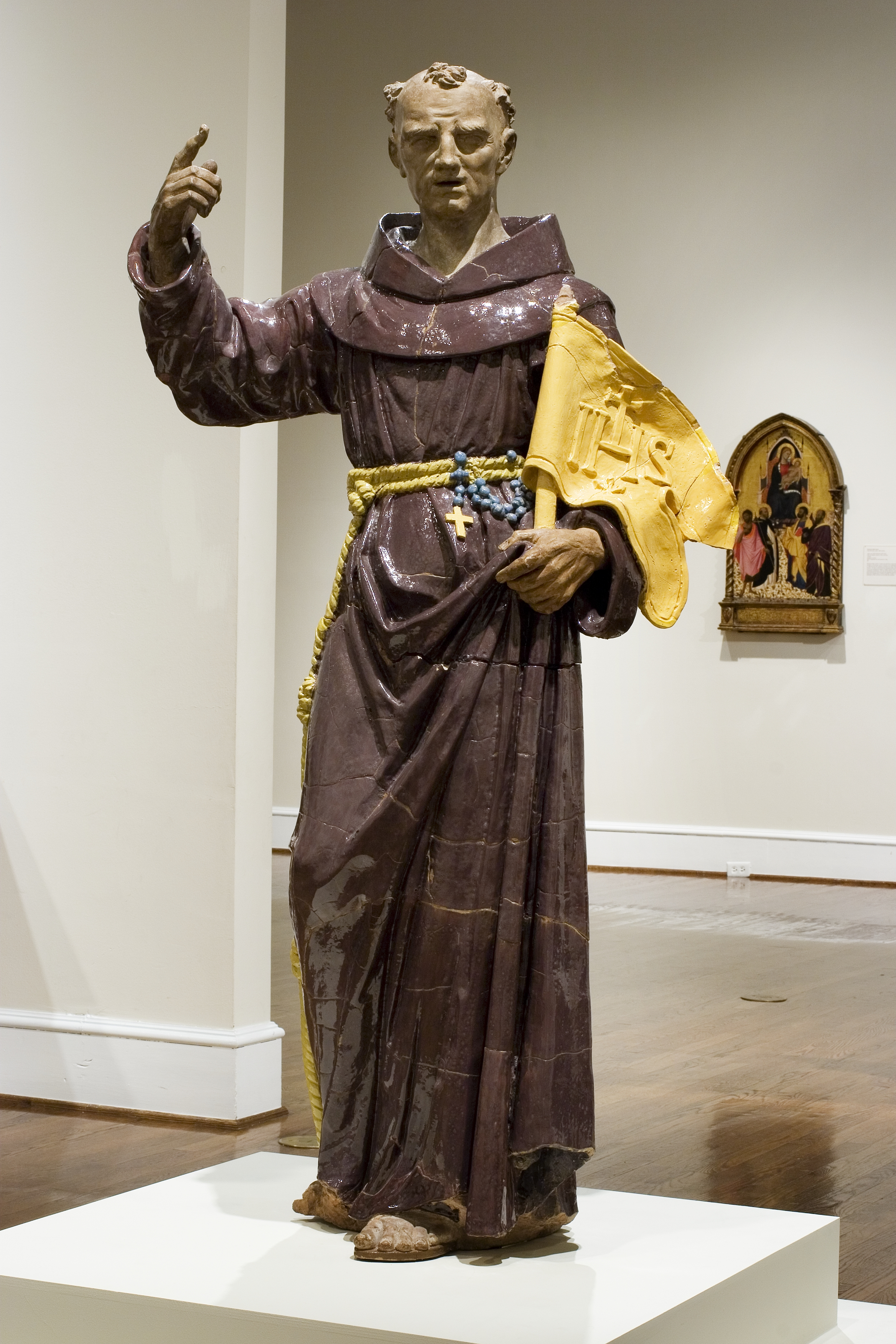
San Giovanni di Capistrano, by Santi Buglioni c. 1550

When he was not preaching, John was writing tracts against heresy of every kind. This facet of his life is covered in great detail by his early biographers, Nicholas of Fara, Christopher of Varese and Girlamo of Udine. While he was thus evangelizing, he was actively engaged in assisting Bernardine of Siena in the reform of the Franciscan Order, largely in the interest of a more rigorous discipline in the Franciscan communities. Like Bernardine, he strongly emphasized devotion to the Holy Name of Jesus, and, together with Bernardine, was accused of heresy on this account. In 1429, these Observant friars were called to Rome to answer charges of heresy, and John was chosen by his companions to speak for them. They were both acquitted by the Commission of Cardinals appointed to judge the accusations.

He was frequently deployed to embassies by Popes Eugene IV and Nicholas V: in 1439, he was sent as legate to Milan and Burgundy, to oppose the claims of the Antipope Felix V; in 1446, he was on a mission to the King of France; in 1451 he went at the request of the emperor as Apostolic Nuncio to Austria. During the period of his nunciature, John visited all parts of the Empire. As legate, or inquisitor, he persecuted the last Fraticelli of Ferrara, the Jesuati of Venice, the Crypto-Jews of Sicily, Moldavia and Poland, and, above all, the Hussites of Germany, Hungary, and Bohemia; his aim in the last case was to make talks impossible between the representatives of Rome and Bohemian "Hussite king" George of Podiebrad, for every attempt at conciliation seemed to him to be conniving at heresy.

He also worked for the reform of the Order of Friars Minor. He upheld, in his writings, speeches and sermons, theories of papal supremacy rather than the theological wranglings of councils (see Conciliar Movement). John, together with his teacher, Bernardine, his colleague, James of the Marche, and Albert Berdini of Sarteano, are considered the four great pillars of the Observant reform among the Friars Minor.

== Actions towards the Jewish community ==
As part of his mission from Nicholas V, John preached extensively against Judaism in Germany, Bohemia, Moravia, and Silesia. He was called the "scourge of the Judeans" or the "scourge of the Hebrews". In 1450, John arranged a disputation (debate) between Jewish and Christian religious experts in Rome. Between 1451 and 1453, his fiery sermons persuaded many southern German regions to expel their entire Jewish populations. When John was in Breslau, there was an accusation that some Jewish residents had desecrated the communion bread, a common antisemitic trope. John supervised the torture of Jewish prisoners until they confessed to this and other crimes. As a result, forty Jews were burned alive, a rabbi hanged himself, and the rest of the Jewish population was expelled. The children of the murdered Jews were taken and baptized into the Catholic faith.

Analyses of John's actions toward Jews and Judaism have tended to be different depending on whether the authors were scholars of Catholicism or Judaism. According to Johannes Hofer, who wrote a biography of John in 1943, "[t]hat in dealing with heretics and Jews he transgressed established bounds and thereby failed against Christian charity is a thought practically unknown to contemporaries. He was at times censured as impractical, but never as uncharitable or inhuman. Even Heinrich Doering, one of his severest critics, finds nothing to blame in Capistrano's behavior toward the Jews." A 2005 encyclopedia of antisemitism, compiled by Richard S. Levy and others, said that John "represented a traditional anti-Judaism based on theological grounds. But he was also a forerunner of modern antisemitism insofar as he sought the social isolation of Jews and held them up to popular contempt. His employment of economic accusations as a tool of mass mobilization, particularly his sermonizing against Jewish usury, also anticipated the techniques of modern antisemites."

== The Soldier Priest ==
The saint's coat of arms, with a sword piercing a crescent moon, on the Papal Ombrellino at Mission Basilica San Juan Capistrano.

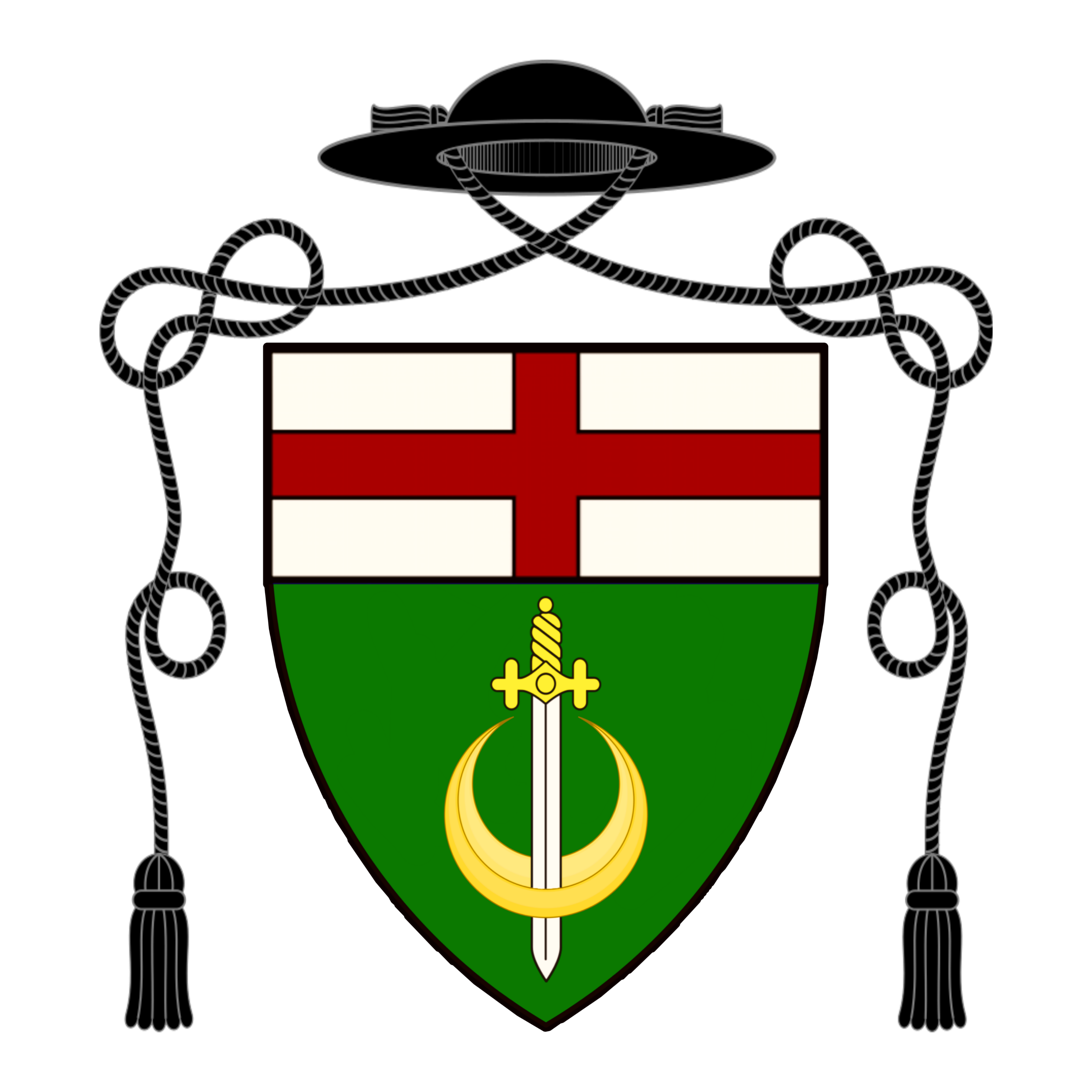
Reconstructed Coat of arms of John of Capistrano

After the fall of Constantinople in 1453, the Ottoman Empire, under Sultan Mehmed II, threatened Christian Europe. That following year Pope Callixtus III sent John, who was already aged 70, to preach a Crusade against the invading Ottomans at the Imperial Diet of Frankfurt. Gaining little response in Bavaria and Austria, he decided to concentrate his efforts in Hungary. By July 1456, Capistrano managed to raise a large, albeit poorly trained force made up of peasants and local countryside landlords, with which he advanced towards Belgrade which was under siege by Turkish forces. Though poorly equipped they were highly motivated. Capistrano and John Hunyadi traveled together, though commanding the army separately. Between them, they had gathered around 40,000–50,000 troops altogether.

Hunyadi managed to break the naval blockade on the Danube, and breach the siege, bringing reinforcements and supplies to the city. By some accounts, the peasant soldiers started a spontaneous action, and forced Capistrano and Hunyadi to take advantage of it. Despite Hunyadi's orders to the defenders not to try to loot the Ottoman positions, some of the units crept out from demolished ramparts, took up positions across from the Ottoman line, and began harassing enemy soldiers. Ottoman Sipahis tried without success to disperse the harassing force. As more defenders joined those outside the wall, what began as an isolated incident quickly escalated into a full-scale battle.

John of Capistrano at first tried to order his men back inside the walls, but soon found himself surrounded by about 2,000 peasant levymen. He then began leading them toward the Ottoman rear across the Sava river. At the same time, Hunyadi started a desperate charge out of the fort to take the cannon positions in the Ottoman encampment. In the aftermath of a fierce battle, the Ottomans withdrew and retreated under cover of darkness; the siege was lifted. His involvement led to Capistrano being called "the Soldier Priest". Although he survived the battle, John fell victim to the bubonic plague, which flourished in the unsanitary conditions prevailing among armies of the day. He died on 23 October 1456 at the nearby town of Ilok (now a Croatian border town on the Danube).

== Sainthood and feast day ==
The year of John of Capistrano's canonization was liturgically celebrated 16 October 1690 by Pope Alexander VIII. The Bull of Canonization, Rationis Congruit, was published on 4 June 1724 by Pope Benedict XIII.

In 1890, his feast day was included for the first time in the General Roman Calendar and assigned to 28 March. In 1969, Pope Paul VI moved his feast day to 23 October, the day of his death. Where Mass and the Office are said according to the 1962 Roman Missal and its concomitant calendar, his feast day remains on March 28.

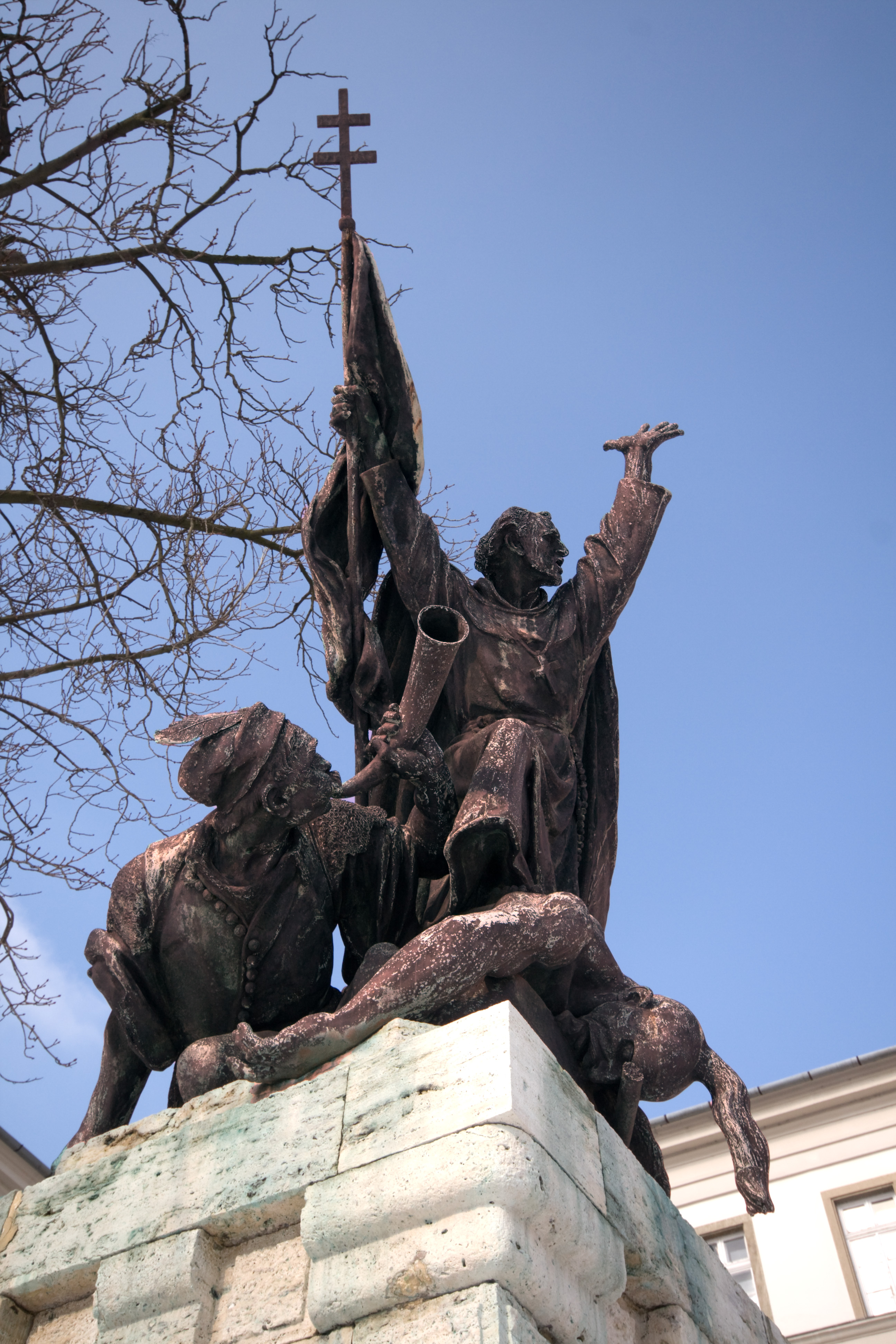
Statue of John of Capistrano in Budapest, Hungary

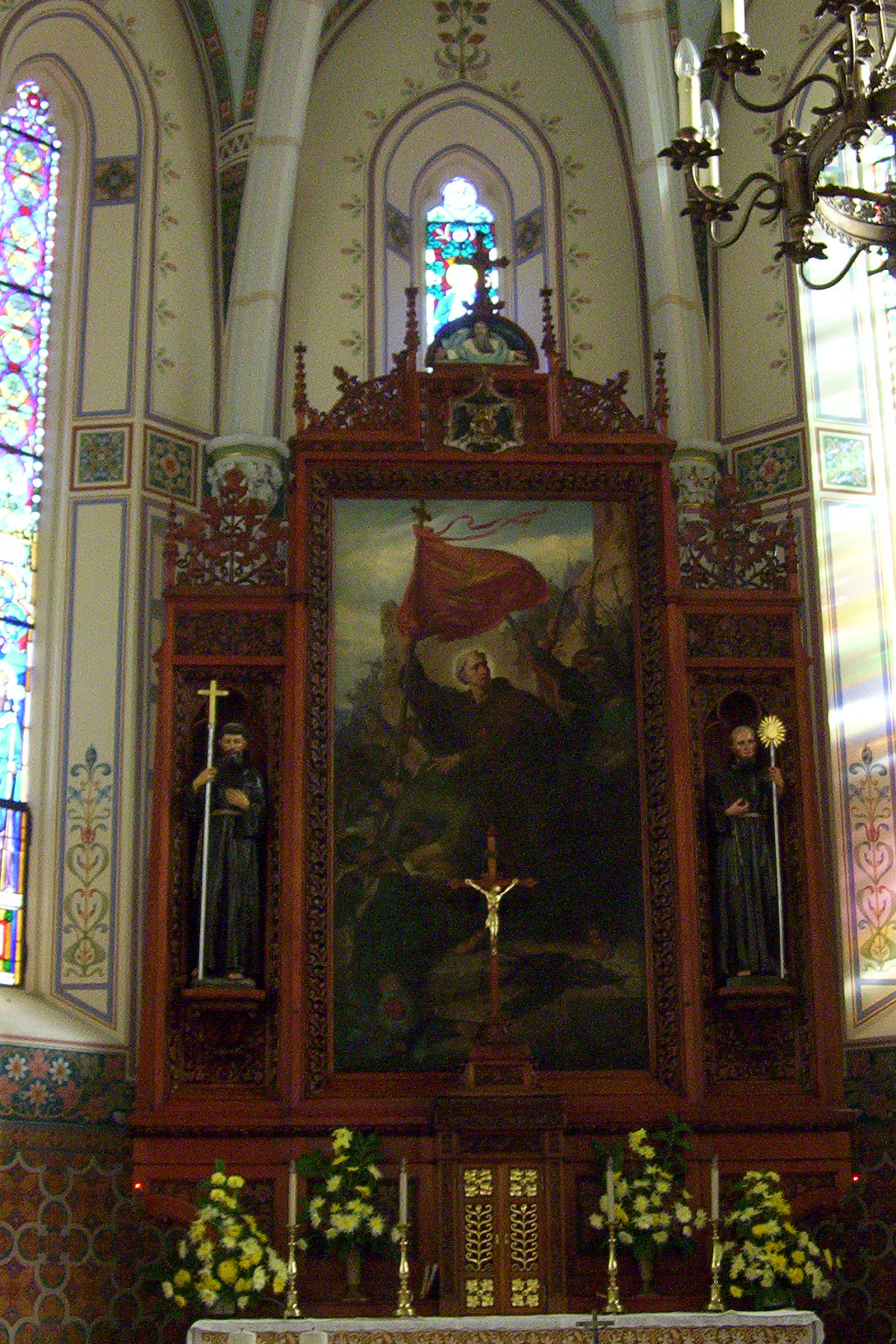
Painting in St. John of Capistrano Church in Ilok, Croatia, where he was buried

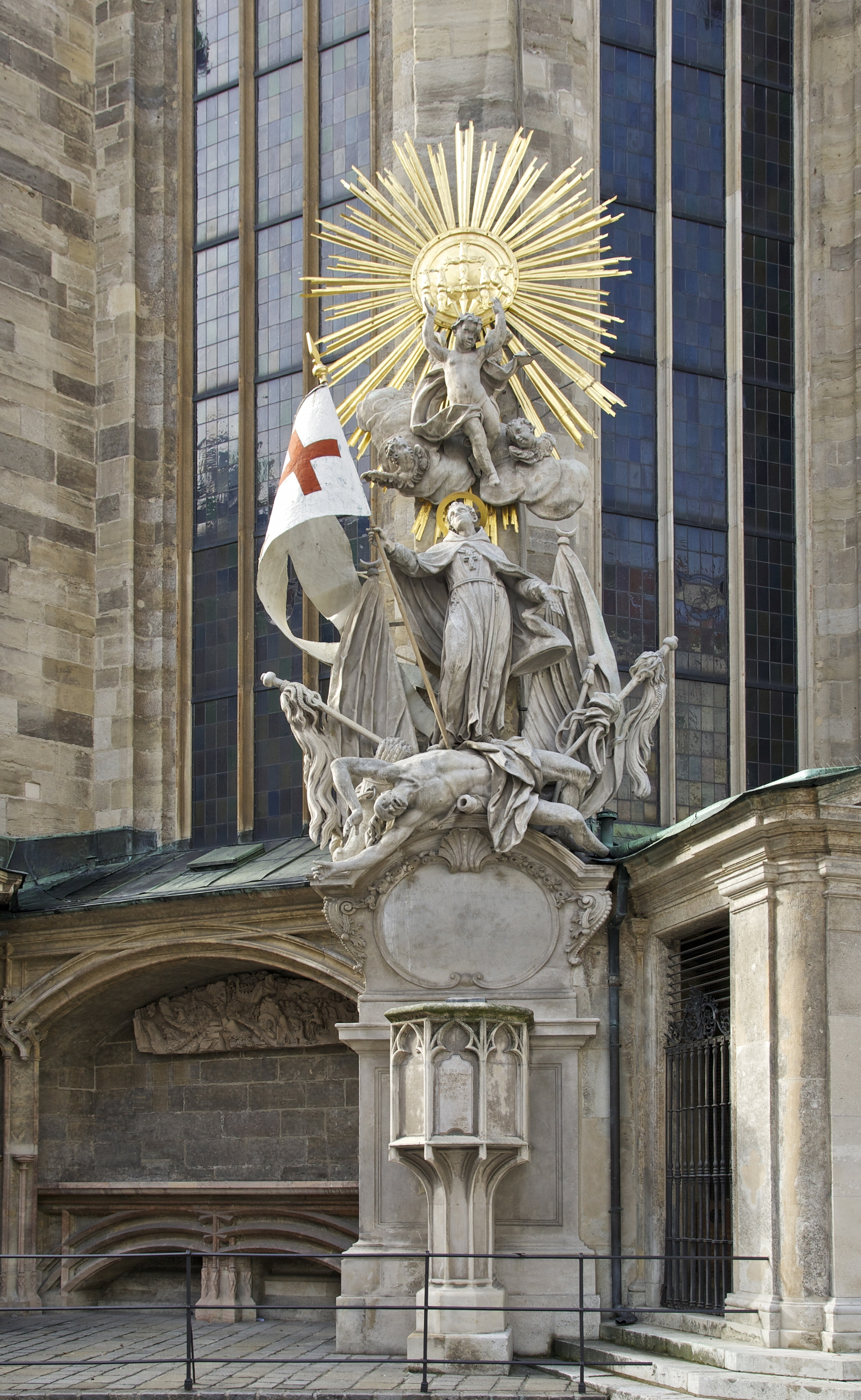
Monument in Vienna, near St. Stephen's Cathedral

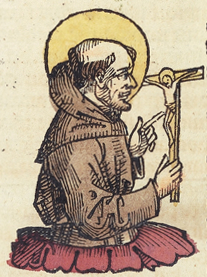
In the Nuremberg Chronicle

== Eponym of missions ==
As a Franciscan reformer preaching simplicity, John became the eponym of two Spanish missions founded by the Franciscan friars in the north of the then-Spanish Americas: Mission San Juan Capistrano in present-day San Juan Capistrano, California, and another Mission San Juan Capistrano just outside the city center of present-day San Antonio, Texas.

== Patron saint ==
He is the patron saint of military chaplains and jurists.

== See also ==
- Church of St. Wojciech, in Kraków, where John preached in 1453
- Saint John of Capistrano, patron saint archive (March 28)
- Saint John of Capistrano, patron saint archive (October 23)
