= Kraków Town Hall =

Coordinates: 50.0614°N 19.9364°E

Town Hall of Kraków
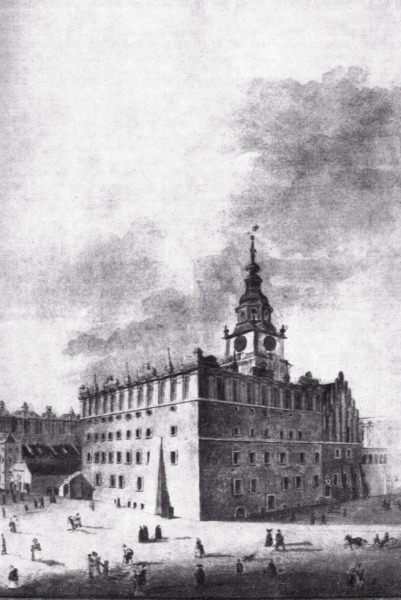
- Former Kraków Town Hall (ratusz) in an engraving from the late 1700s

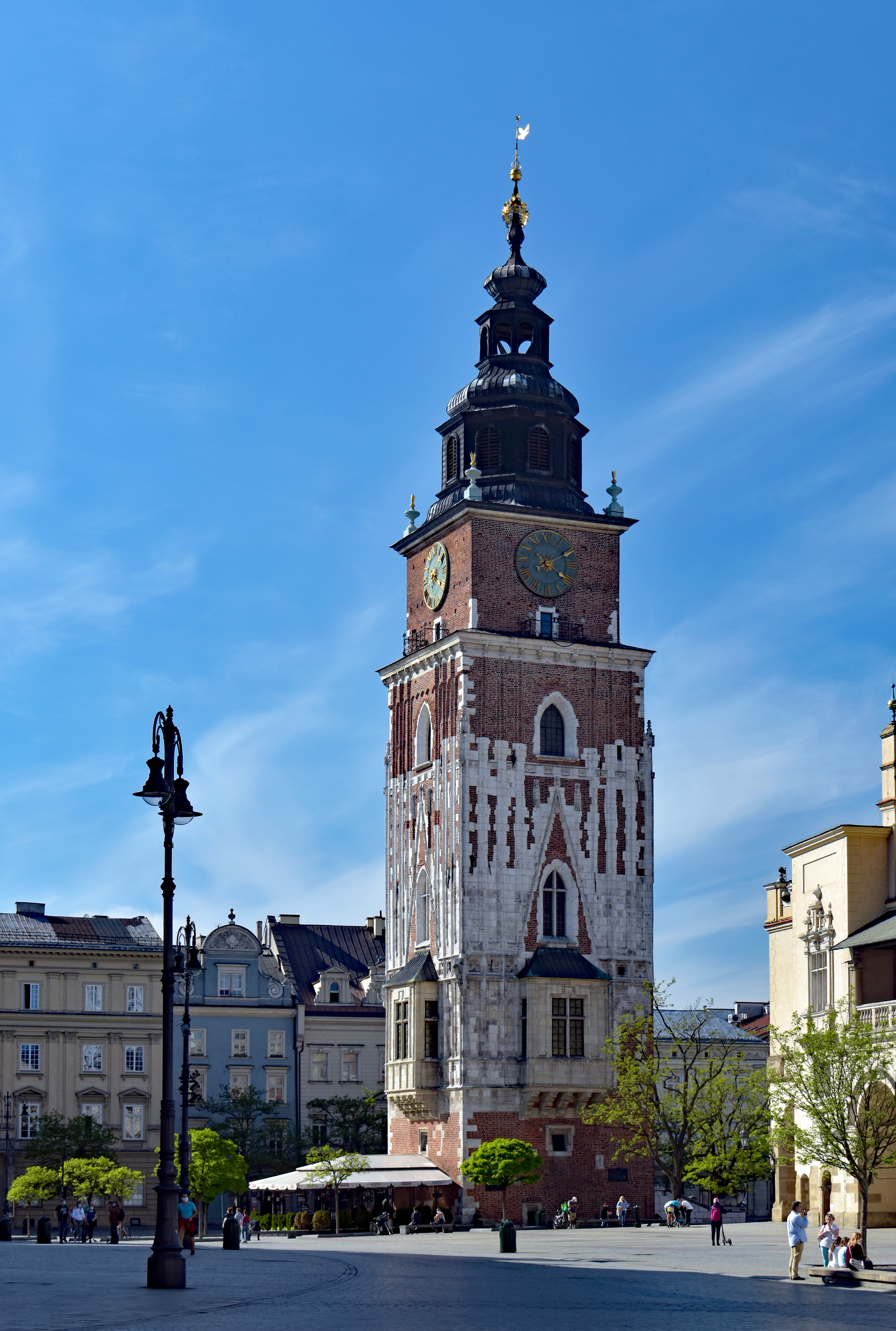
- Town Hall Tower, Kraków, the only surviving part of the old Town Hall

The historic Town Hall of Kraków, known as Ratusz in Polish, was demolished in 1820. It was constructed of brick and mortar for the first time in 1316 as one of its subsequent several versions built over the following centuries. It was the city's administrative hub and seat of the great council, magistrate, and mayor from the 14th until the early 19th century. It was located in the centre of Main Square in the Kraków Old Town. It used to be one of Poland's oldest seats of civic government. Of the building, only the Town Hall Tower remains, serving as prominent example of the Polish Gothic architecture in the city.

The building was situated next to the Kraków Cloth Hall in the south-western part of the Main Square. The construction and reconstruction periods stretched across centuries, with various parts of the building enlarged and remodelled. The Town Hall was demolished in 1820 under the Austrian Partition of the Polish–Lithuanian Commonwealth when the Main Square was also rebuilt, with only the tower being saved following public protests among prominent Cracovians. The building housed various offices of the city. There are proposals to reconstruct it.

== See also ==
- Great Weigh House, former structure that existed in the main square of Kraków
- Kraków Cloth Hall, built during the Renaissance in Poland

Media related to City Hall in Kraków at Wikimedia Commons
