= Piotr Wysz Radoliński =

Polish Catholic bishop

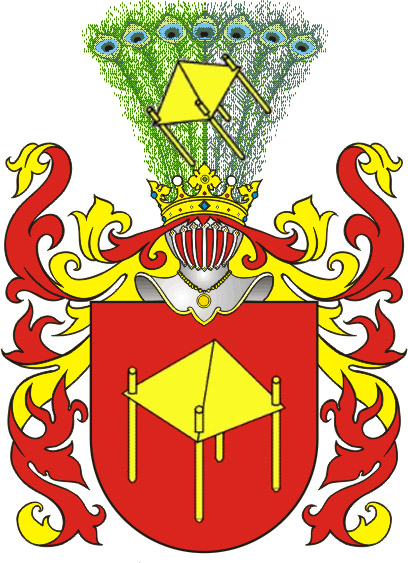
Leszczyc coat of arms

Piotr Wysz Radoliński of Leszczyc coat of arms was born c. 1354 in Radolin and died on 30 September 1414 in Poznań. He was a bishop of Kraków from 1392, and a bishop of Poznań from 1412. A lawyer by profession, he studied in Prague and Padua, where in 1386 he received his doctorate in dual law.

Radoliński worked for the King Władysław II Jagiełło and Queen Jadwiga. From 1391 he served as a chancellor in the court of the queen, and on 4 December 1392 was appointed Bishop of Kraków. He was a signatory to two Polish-Lithuanian acts of union, that of Vilnius and Radom in 1401 and of Horodło in 1413.

He co-founded the Department of Theology of the Jagiellonian University in 1397 per decree of Pope Boniface IX. Radoliński was also the first chancellor of the university.

== See also ==
- Church of St. Wojciech
- List of Bishops of Poznań
