= Church of St. Adalbert, Kraków =

Roman Catholic church in Krakow, Poland

Church of St. Adalbert
- Kościół św. Wojciecha
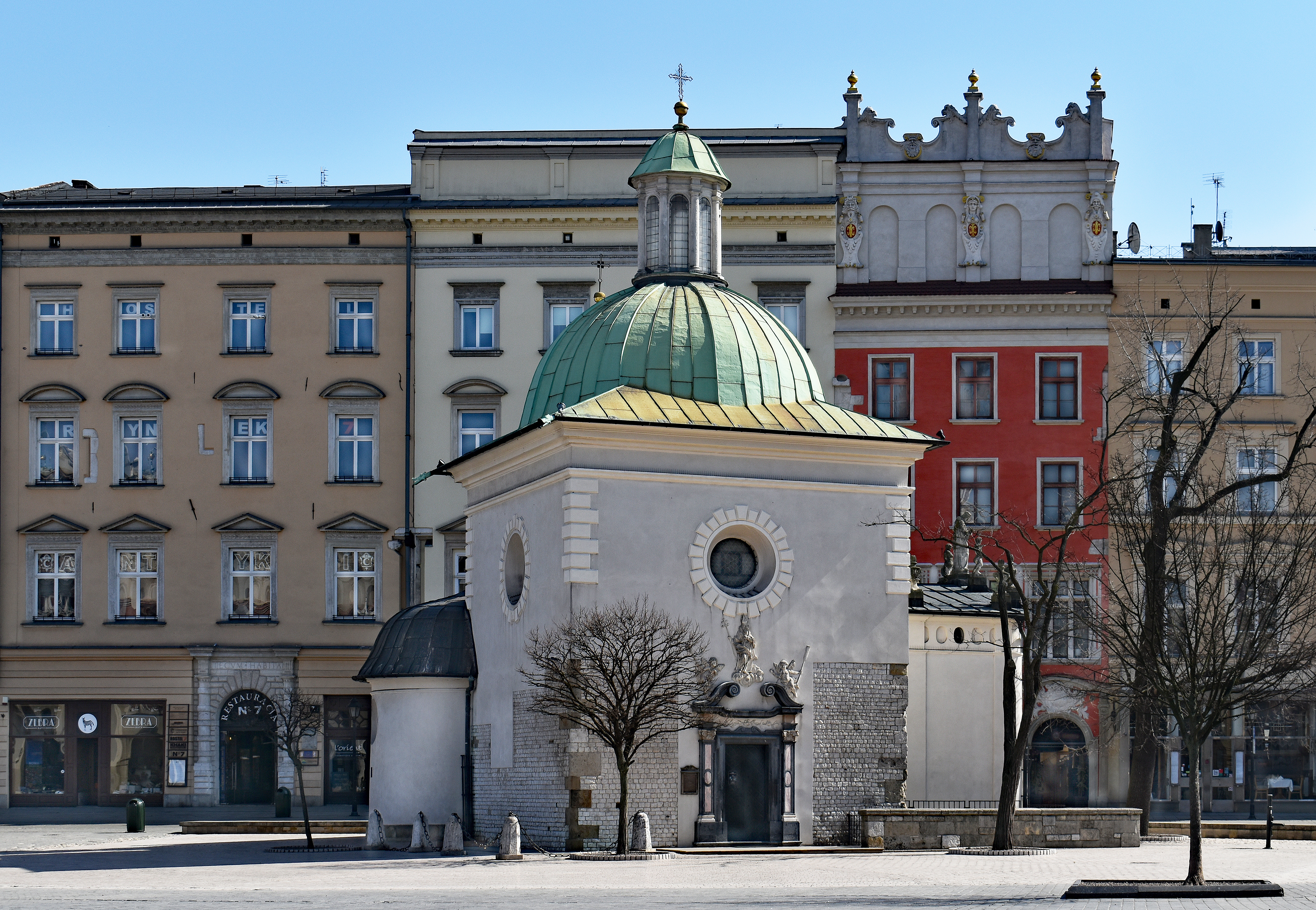
- View from the west
- Church of St. Adalbert
- 50°03′39.3″N 19°56′15.9″E
- Location: Kraków
- Address: 2 Main Market Square
- Country: Poland
- Denomination: Roman Catholic

UNESCO World Heritage Site
- Type: Cultural
- Criteria: iv
- Designated: 1978
- Part of: Historic Centre of Kraków
- Reference no.: 29
- Region: Europe and North America

Historic Monument of Poland
- Designated: 1994-09-08
- Part of: Kraków historical city complex
- Reference no.: M.P. 1994 nr 50 poz. 418

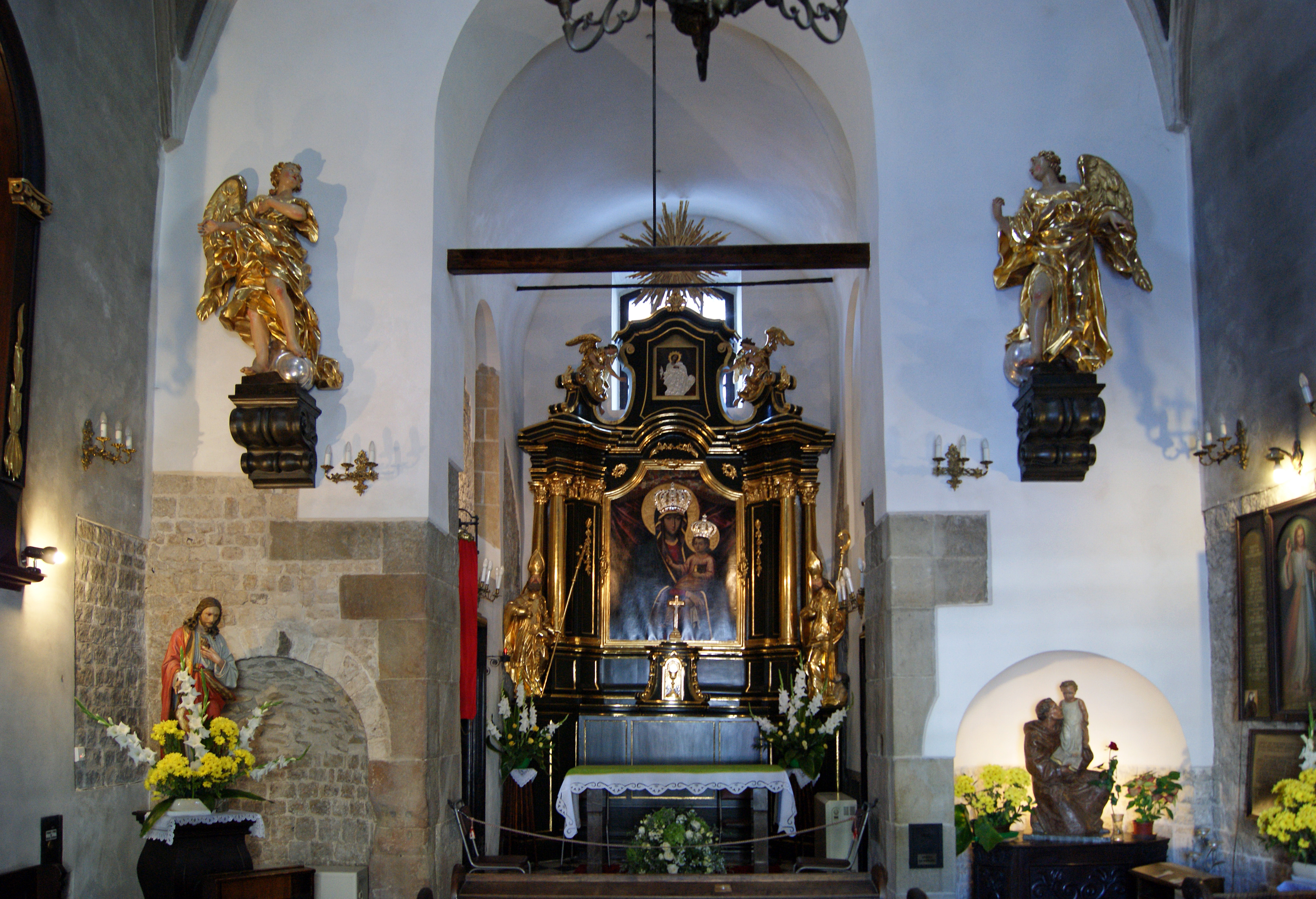
Interior of the church

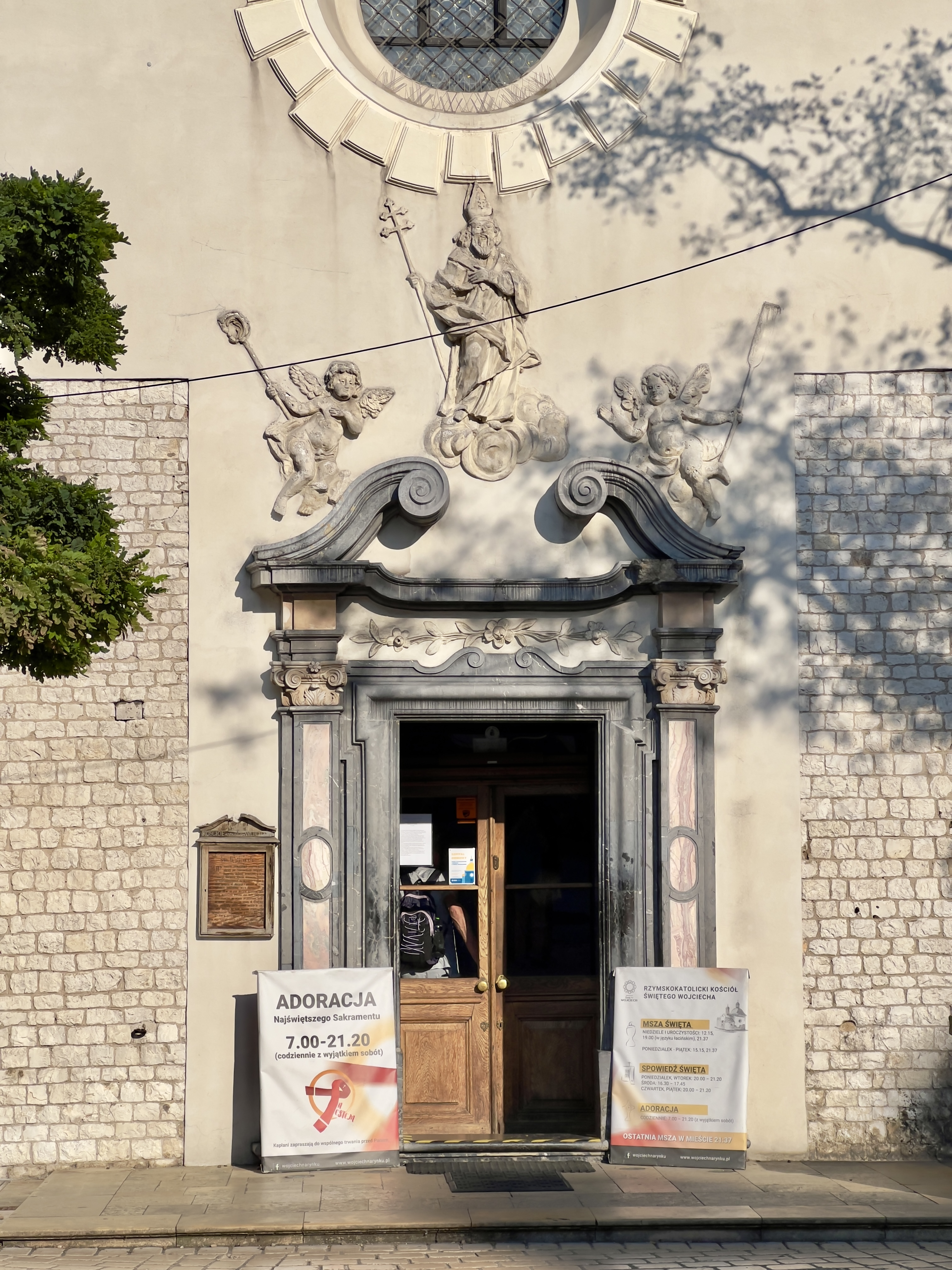
Entrance, baroque portal

The Church of St. Adalbert or the Church of St. Wojciech (Polish: Kościół św. Wojciecha), located on the intersection of the Main Market Square and Grodzka Street in Old Town, Kraków, is one of the oldest stone churches in Poland. Its almost 1000-year-old history goes back to the beginning of the Polish Romanesque architecture of the early Middle Ages. Throughout the early history of Kraków the Church of St. Wojciech was a place of worship first visited by merchants travelling from across Europe. It was a place where citizens and nobility would meet.

== History ==
The Church was built in the 11th century and named after the martyred missionary Saint Adalbert (Polish: św. Wojciech) whose body was bought back for its weight in gold from the pagan Prussia and placed in Gniezno Cathedral by Boleslaus I of Poland. The Church of St. Adalbert stands at the south-eastern corner of the biggest medieval market square in Europe, demarcated in 1257. The place of worship preceded the Square by nearly a century. The interior of the church is cramped, relative to its larger exterior. The floor level is situated under the present level of the Square, which reflects the overlaying of the subsequent surfaces of the plaza with pavement originally adjusted to the two already existing churches (St. Wojciech/Adalbert and St. Mary's Basilica). The church was partially reconstructed in the Baroque style in 1611–1618.

According to the Archaeological Museum of Kraków, the oldest relics reveal a wooden structure built at the end of the 10th century and followed by an original stone church constructed in the 11th century, as seen in the lower parts of the walls. These walls became a foundation for a new church built around the turn of the 11th and 12th centuries from smaller rectangular stones. Since the level of the plaza, overlaid with new pavement, rose between 2 and 2.6 metres, the walls of the church were raised up in the 17th century and then covered with stucco. The new entrance was built from the west side and the church was topped with the new Baroque dome. The restoration of the church conducted in the 19th century led to the discovery of its Romanesque past.

At present, the walls of the church are unearthed to show their lowest level. On the south side there's a Romanesque portal and corresponding stone step. The crypt of the church has been adapted by the Archaeological Museum as a small Museum of the History of the Market Square showing a permanent exhibit of "The History of the Kraków Market." For an unsuspecting visitor St. Wojciech's seems inviting from the outside, nevertheless, it is a living church with people often praying inside while the door opens directly into the noise outside.

The thousand year old legend has it that St. Adalbert consecrated the church in 997 and preached there before going on his mission to bring Christianity to Prussia (where he was killed in martyrdom). Not surprisingly, in the 1960s the discovery was made of the earliest church dating back to the times when St. Adalbert (Św. Wojciech) resided in Kraków and gave his sermons there.

Located next to the church and the cloth hall were the Great Weigh House and the Small Weigh House.

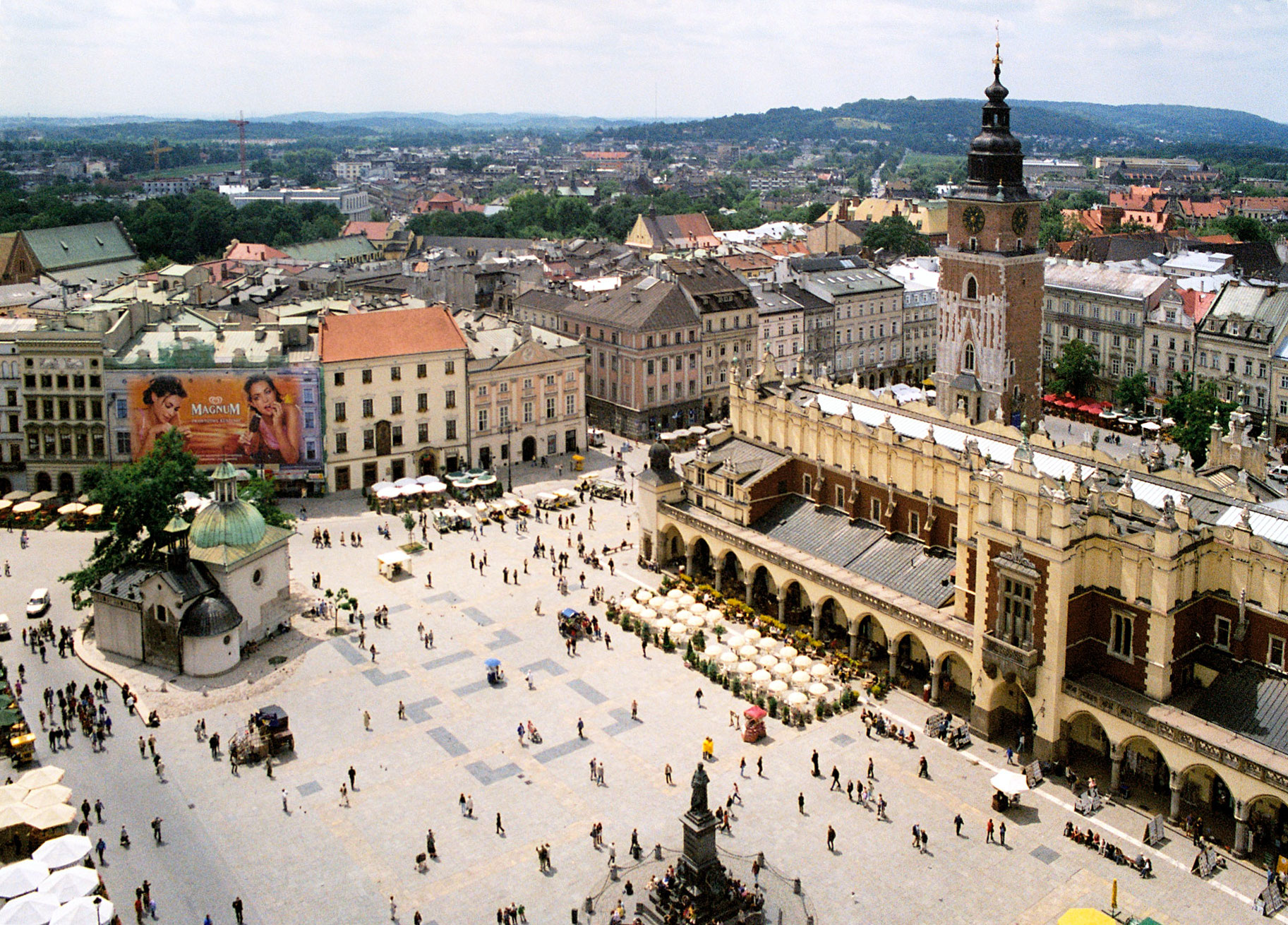
Bird's eye view of the Church of St. Adalbert on the main square

== Timeline ==
- 10th century – first wooden church erected
- 11th to 12th centuries – first stone church, Romanesque elements including existing walls and portal
- 1404 – the church becomes the University Presbytery thanks to Father Piotr Wysz Radoliński
- 1453 – sermons by Father Giovanni da Capistrano
- 1611–1618 – major reconstruction of the church in Baroque style. The raising of the walls, stuccoing, building of the Baroque dome and the new entrance from the west side. The works are directed by Prof. Walenty Fontana and Father Sebastian Mirosz
- 1711 – the building of the new vestry
- 1778 – adding of the St. Jan Nepomucen Chapel (renamed after St. Wincenty Kadłubek in 1781)

== See also ==
- Churches of Kraków
- Culture of Kraków
- Culture of medieval Poland
- Kingdom of Poland (1138–1320)
