= Great Weigh House =

Coordinates: 50.0611°N 19.9375°E

- Wielka Waga
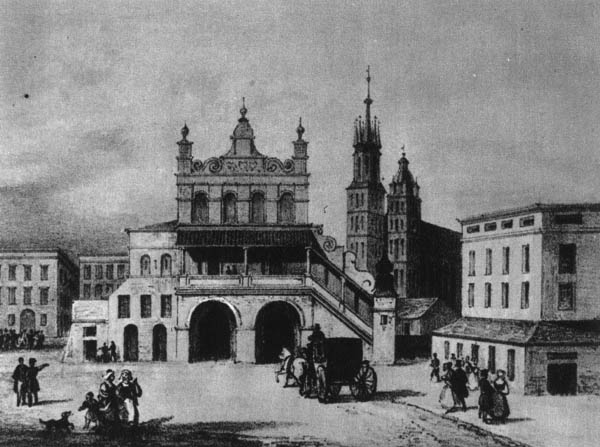
- View of Wielka Waga (extreme right) and Sukiennice (centre), 19th century engraving

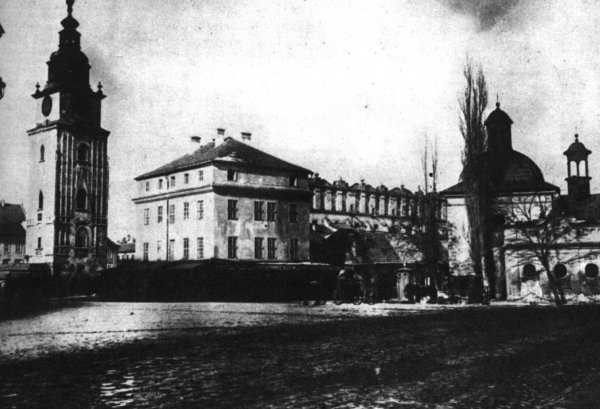
- Historical photograph of the Great Weigh House, as seen from the Grodzka Street, with Town Hall Tower (left) and St. Adalbert (right)

The Great Weigh House (Polish: Wielka Waga Miejska) was a prominent building that existed on the main square of Kraków, Poland. It was located in between the Cloth Hall (Sukiennice) and Church of St. Adalbert to the east. Next to it was the Small Weigh House.

== History ==
Wielka Waga was a public building in which trading goods transported to Kraków were weighed. As the official, public control of the weight of goods was crucial, it was run by the local authorities who would use the weights for the levying of taxes on goods sold within the city and transported further.

Most likely, the Great Weigh House was originally a wooden building. It was first mentioned in 1302. By the second half of the 14th century, it was rebuilt as a brick structure. The importance and role of the weigh house diminished however by the 17th and 18th century. The structure was demolished either in 1868 or most likely in 1875.

The foundations of the weigh houses were excavated in the early 21st century and incorporated into an underground museum.

== See also ==
- Kraków Town Hall, torn down in 1820
