= Józef Dietl =

Polish-Austrian medical doctor and politician (1804–1878)

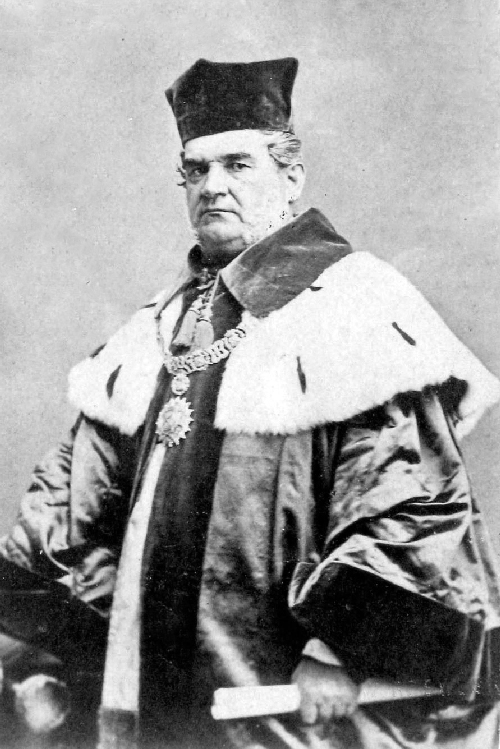
Dietl in 1860

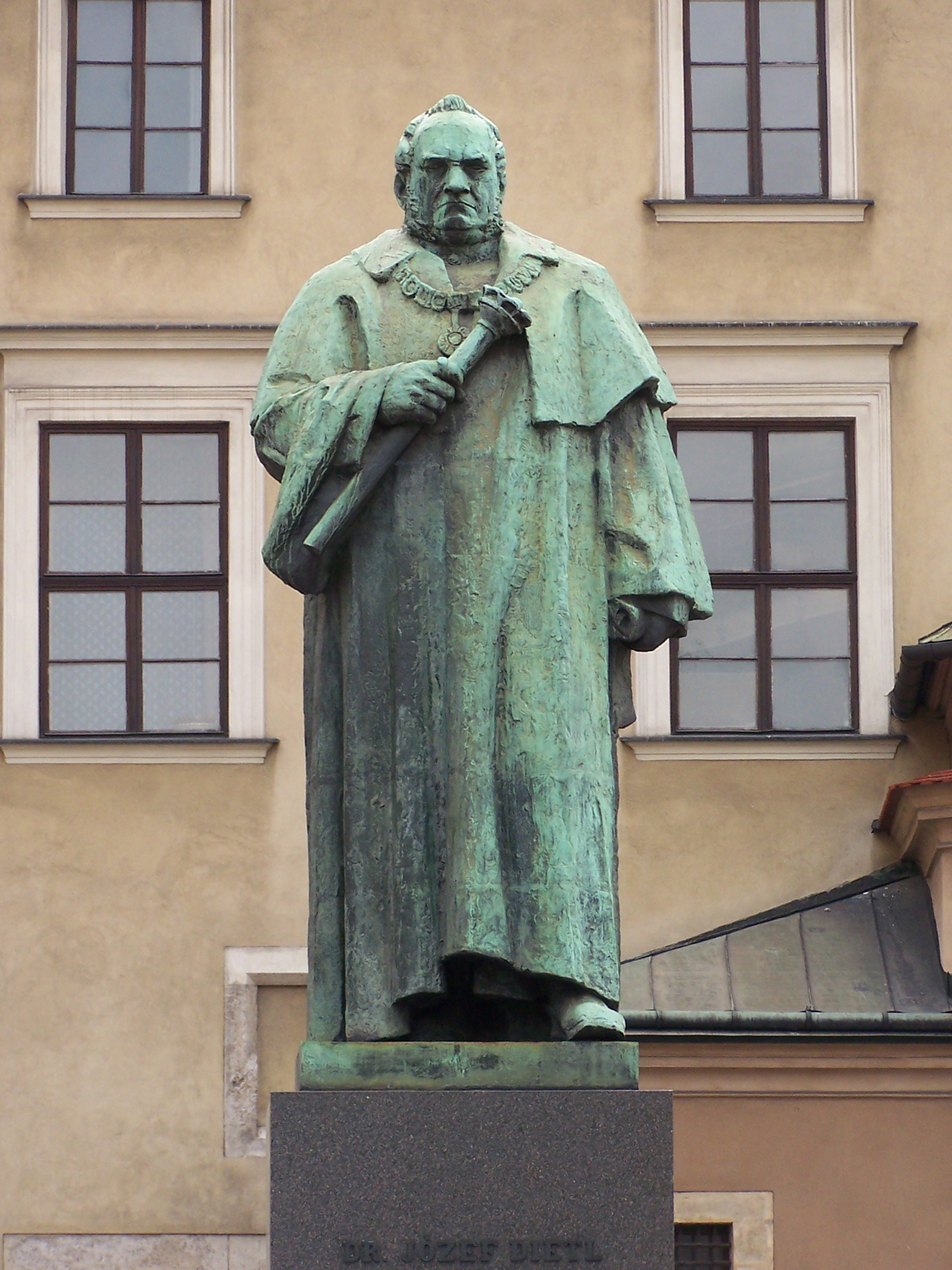
A statue of Józef Dietl in Kraków by Xawery Dunikowski

Józef Dietl (24 January 1804 – 18 January 1878) was a Polish-Austrian medical doctor and politician. He was the mayor of Kraków in 1866–1874.

== Life ==
Dietl was born on 24 January 1804 in Podbuże near Sambor to an Austrian father and Polish mother. He studied medicine in Lviv and Vienna. He was a pioneer in balneology, and a professor of Jagiellonian University, elected as its rector in 1861. Dietl described the kidney ailment known as "Dietl's crisis" as well as its treatment.

He is renowned worldwide for being a "reformer of medicine" since he demonstrated through experiments that bloodletting was useless if not dangerous. His experiments were based on the use of a control group, a procedure still used today in the so-called "clinical trials" foundation of evidence-based medicine.

From 1866 to 1874, Dietl was the mayor of Kraków. He died in Kraków on 18 January 1878, six days before his 74th birthday.
