= Mikołaj Sienicki =

Noble of the Kingdom of Poland (c.1521–1582)

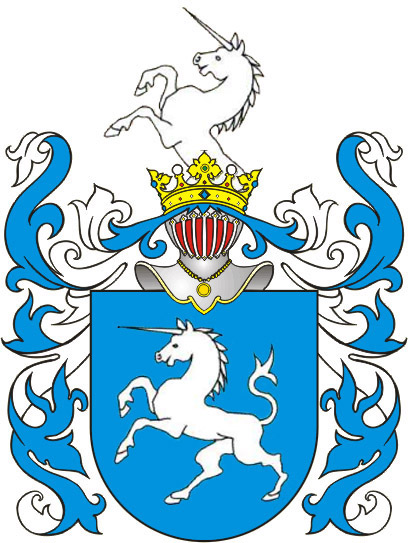
Coat of arms of Mikołaj Sienicki

Mikołaj Sienicki of Bończa (c. 1521-1582) was a member of the nobility of the Kingdom of Poland. He held the office of chamberlain of the land of Chełm and was a notable politician of his period. Considered a skilled Polish political orator, he also held the title of marshal of the Sejm nine times. A Protestant, near the end of his life he became a member of the Polish Brethren and one of the major initiators of, and contributors to the Warsaw Confederation, which introduced new laws of religious tolerance in the Polish–Lithuanian Commonwealth, on a scale unimaginable in contemporary Europe.

== Early career ==
Sienicki was born around 1521 to Stanisław Sienicki and Barbara née Boryszewska. In 1535, he started his studies at the Jagiellonian University, one of the oldest universities in Europe. Soon afterward, he took an active interest in politics, joining his father in the sessions of the local parliament (sejmik) of his home region (Chełm land or ziemia chełmska). He was chosen several times as a royal legate to those diets and gained much respect and popularity among his peers.

== The Sejm career ==
After the death of his father, he was already an established politician. In 1550, he was elected by the sejmik of Chełm to be a region's deputy for the national Sejm. During this Sejm, Sienicki gained fame with his critique of the senators, whom he accused of not providing any assistance to the king, and for his critique of the king himself (Zygmunt II August, who at that time was in a dispute with much of the nobility over his marriages). This would not be the last of his speeches in the Sejm; over the next few years, he would gain fame as the Polish Demosthenes.

From 1553 onwards, he was an active member of the executionist movement, a political party of the middle nobility that opposed the magnates and sought to reform the kingdom. He was a vocal member of the group demanding the return of the Crown Lands held illegally by the magnates, the enforcement of the incompatibilitas rule, and reform of the starost office to strengthen the law enforcement in Poland. He was also an expert on parliamentary law and is often credited with introducing or popularizing many legal terms in Poland. He supported a closer Polish–Lithuanian union and a strong advocate of the Union of Lublin, which transformed the previous personal union between the Kingdom of Poland and the Grand Duchy of Lithuania into a new state of the Polish–Lithuanian Commonwealth. In the realm of religion, he supported the Reformation and various institutions like Akademia Rakowicka. At the same time, he also criticized Polish Catholics for their dependence on Rome, while supporting those, like Jakub Uchański, who sought more independence for local Polish religious hierarchy and even the creation of a Polish national church.

Over the 30 years of his political career, Sienicki participated in 22 out of 25 national Sejms (from 1550 to 1583). He had enormous support of the other deputies: he was often chosen as the deputies' delegate to the king and senators and held the temporary office of the marshal of the Sejm nine times (Piotrków 15.05.-26.07.1550, Kraków 1.02.-29.03.1553, Piotrków 22.04.-15.06.1555, Warsaw 6.12.1556-14.01.1557, Piotrków 5.12.1558-8.02.1559, Warsaw 22.11.1563-1.04.1564, Parczew 24.06.-12.08.1564; Piotrków 18.01.-14.04.1556, election sejm at Wola 7.11.-15.12.1575). No other politician in Polish history would ever come close to his record.

He was widely respected for his dedication to the kingdom and the Commonwealth, never striving for more than the minor office of podkomorzy of Chełm, and never stepping on the wrong side of the law.

== The confederation of Warsaw and royal elections ==
Sienicki was one of the initiators of the Warsaw Confederation. A vocal supporter of religious tolerance and the need for national unity, he strongly criticized the delaying tactics of the Catholic clergy, which threatened the political stability of the newly founded Commonwealth during the uneasy time of the interregnum. After the confederation had been signed, he was one of the major supporters (together with other pro-reform-minded Polish politicians like kanclerz Jan Zamoyski) of the inclusion of its provisions in the Henrician articles and later in the pacta conventa. He also supported the creation of the Crown Tribunal and other reforms of the Polish-Lithuanian State.

He criticized the archbishop of Gniezno, who declared himself the temporary ruler (interrex); he also criticized magnates who wanted to elect a Habsburg candidate to the throne of Poland. Together with middle and lesser nobility, he supported the election of Henry III of France and later Stefan Batory to the Polish throne.
