= Kraków Old Town =

Old Town of Kraków, Poland

Old Town
- Former quarter of Kraków
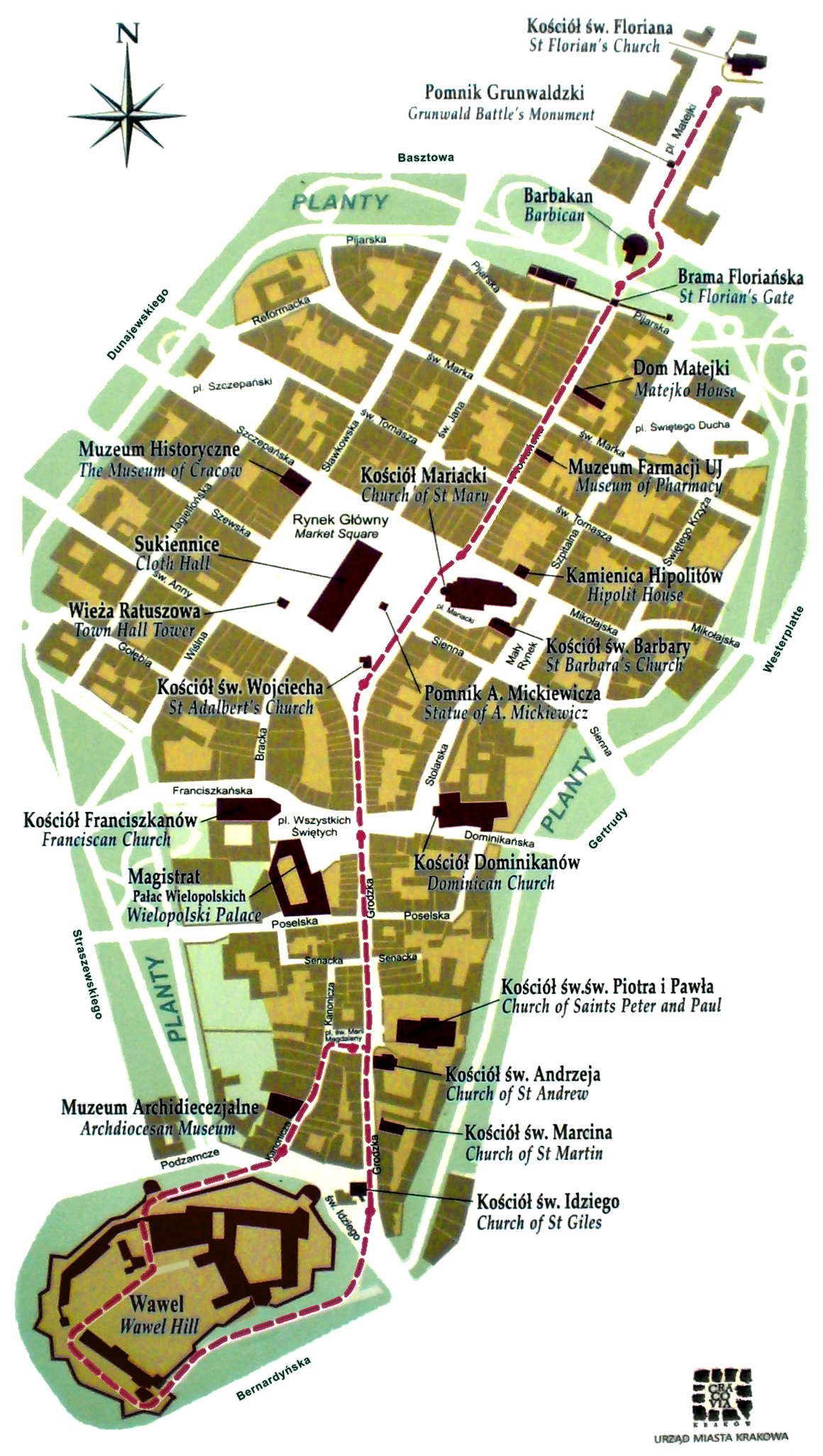
- Map of Old Town and Wawel
- Coordinates: 50°03′43″N 19°56′17″E
- City: Kraków

UNESCO World Heritage Site
- Type: Cultural
- Criteria: iv
- Designated: 1978
- Part of: Historic Centre of Kraków
- Reference no.: 29
- Region: Europe and North America

Historic Monument of Poland
- Designated: 1994-09-08
- Part of: Kraków historical city complex
- Reference no.: M.P. 1994 nr 50 poz. 418

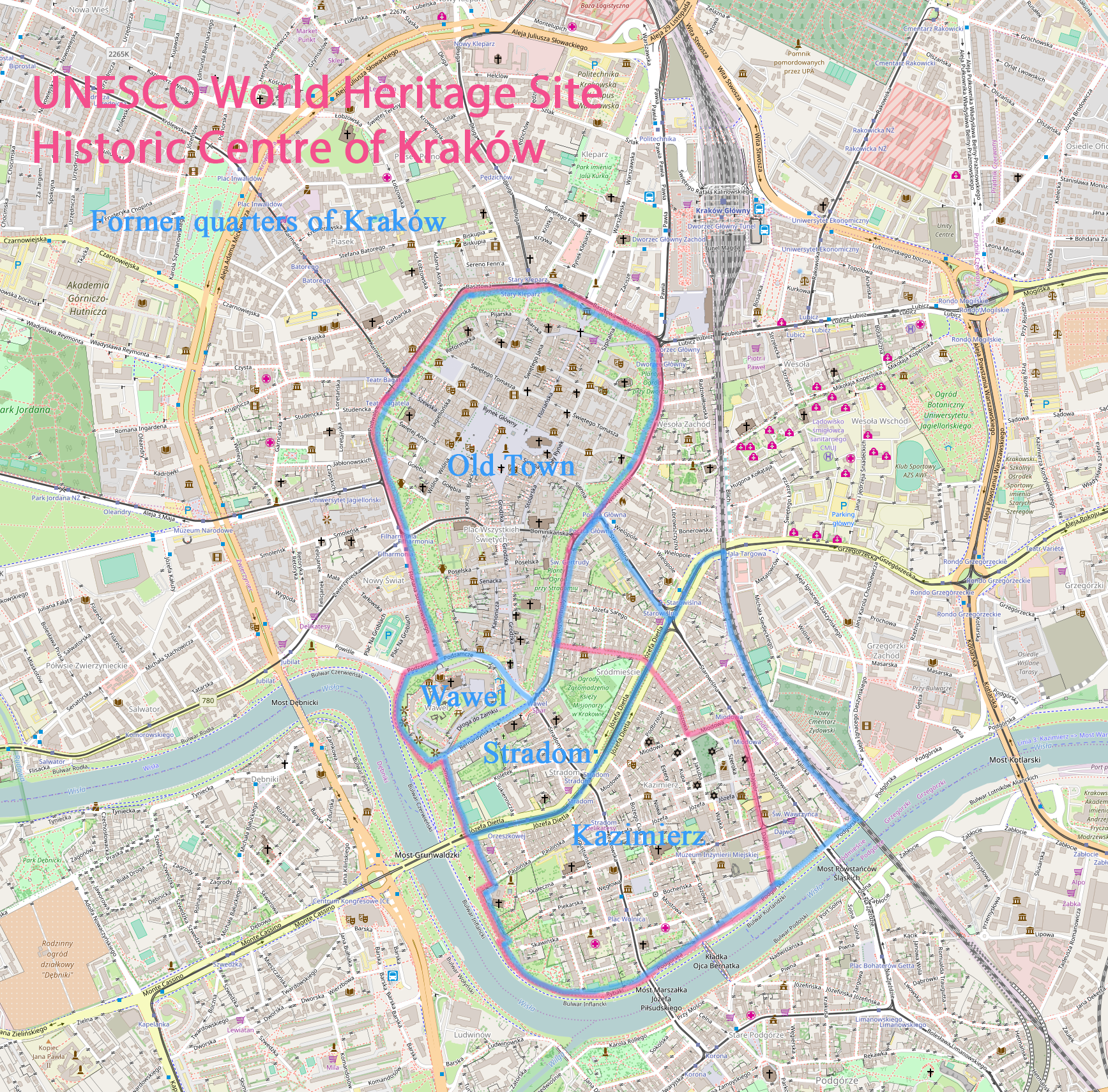
The Old Town, part of the Historic Centre of Kraków UNESCO World Heritage Site

Old Town (Polish: Stare Miasto) is the oldest, historic part of the city of Kraków within the Planty Park, Poland.

It is one of the most famous old areas in Poland today and was the centre of Poland's political life from 1038 until King Sigismund III Vasa relocated his court to Warsaw in 1596.

The entire medieval old town is among the first sites chosen for the UNESCO's original World Heritage List, as part of the Historic Centre of Kraków. The old town is also one of Poland's official national Historic Monuments (Pomnik historii) chosen in the first round, as designated 16 September 1994, and tracked by the National Heritage Board of Poland.

The Old Town is known in Polish as Stare Miasto. It is part of the city's first administrative district which is also named "Stare Miasto", although it covers a wider area than the Old Town itself.

Medieval Kraków was surrounded by a 3 km (1.9 mi) defensive wall complete with 46 towers and seven main entrances leading through them. The fortifications around the Old Town were erected over the course of two centuries. The current architectural plan of Stare Miasto – the 13th-century merchants' town – was drawn up in 1257 after the destruction of the city during the Tatar invasions of 1241 followed by raids of 1259 and repelled in 1287. The district features the centrally located Main Market Square (Rynek Główny), the largest medieval town square of any European city. There is a number of historic landmarks in its vicinity, such as St. Mary's Basilica (Kościół Mariacki), Church of St. Wojciech (St. Adalbert's), Church of St. Barbara, as well as other national treasures. At the centre of the plaza, surrounded by kamienice (tenement houses) and noble residences, stands the Renaissance cloth hall Sukiennice (currently housing gift shops, restaurants and merchant stalls) with the National Gallery of Art upstairs. It is flanked by the Town Hall Tower (Wieża ratuszowa).

The whole district is bisected by the Royal Road, the coronation route traversed by the Kings of Poland. The Route begins at St. Florian's Church outside the northern flank of the old city walls in the medieval suburb of Kleparz; passes the Barbican of Kraków (Barbakan) built in 1499, and enters Stare Miasto through the Florian Gate. It leads down Floriańska Street through the Main Square, and up Grodzka to Wawel, the former seat of Polish royalty overlooking the Vistula river.

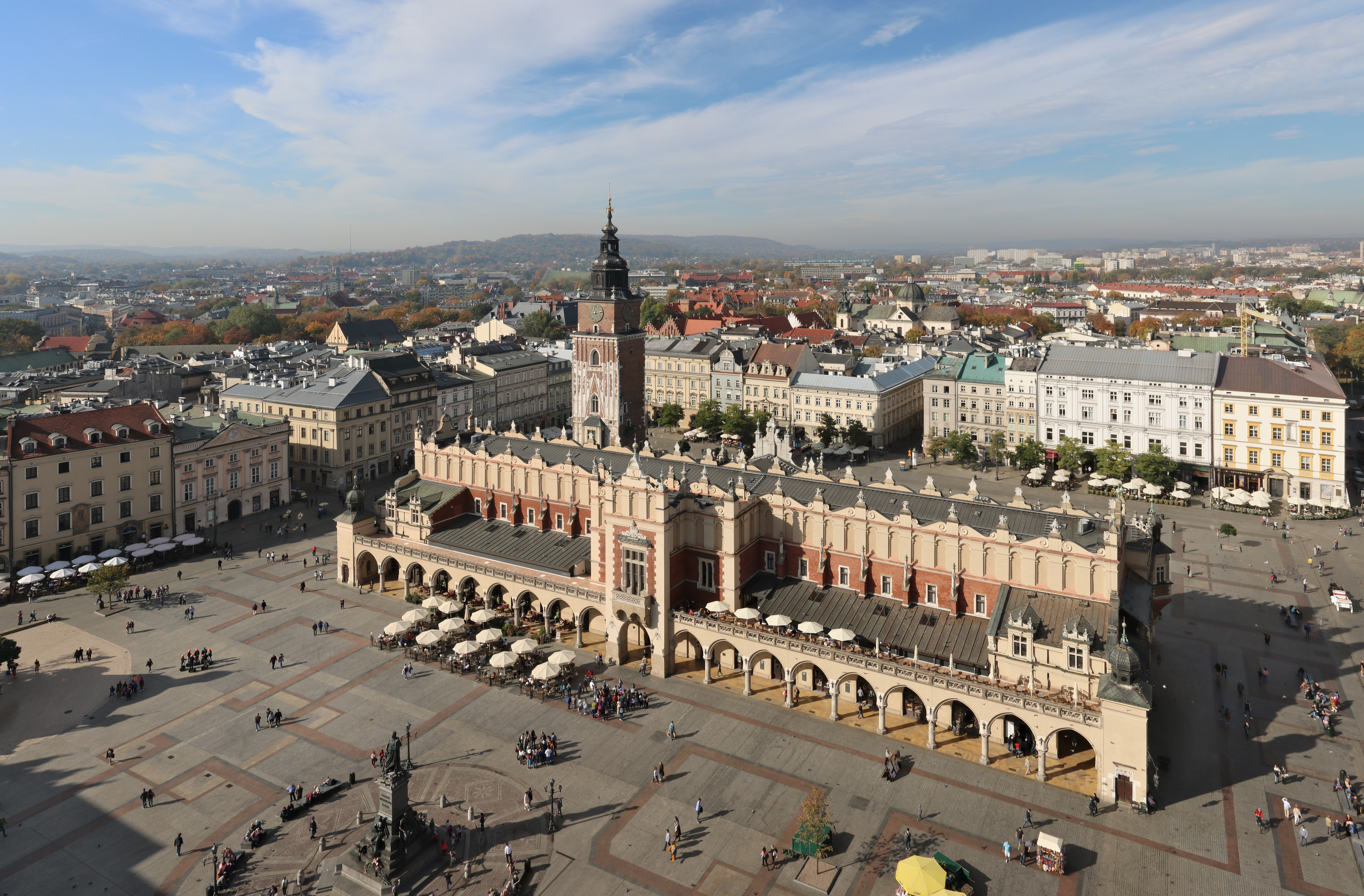
Main Market Square (view from St. Mary's Basilica)

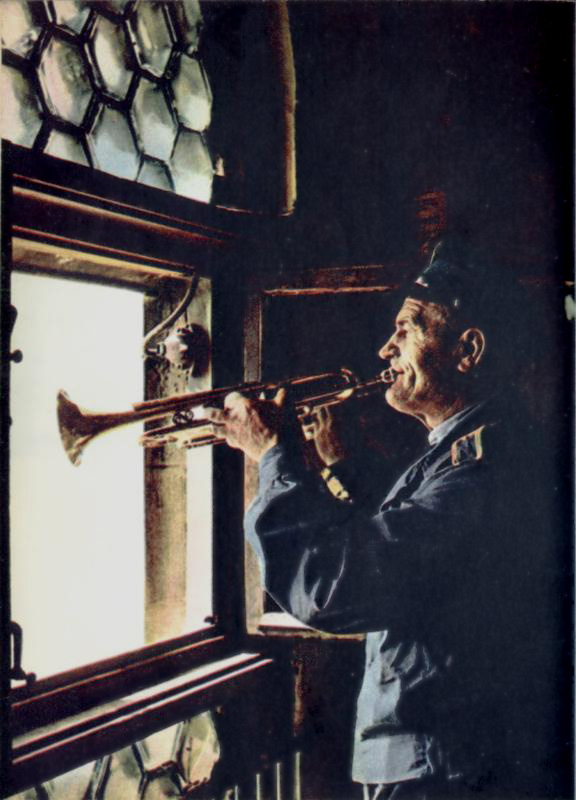
Trumpeter playing the Heynal

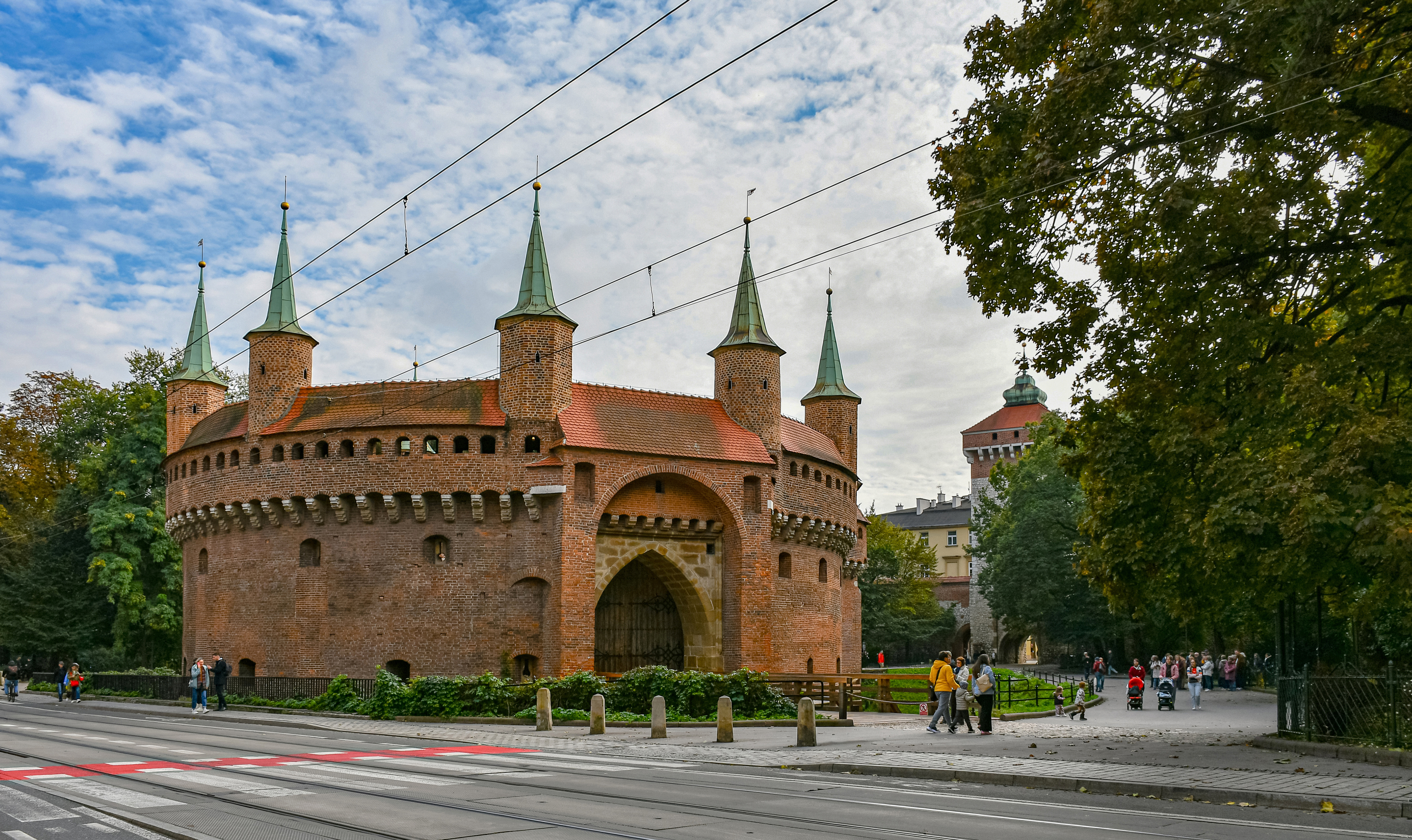
Barbican of Kraków

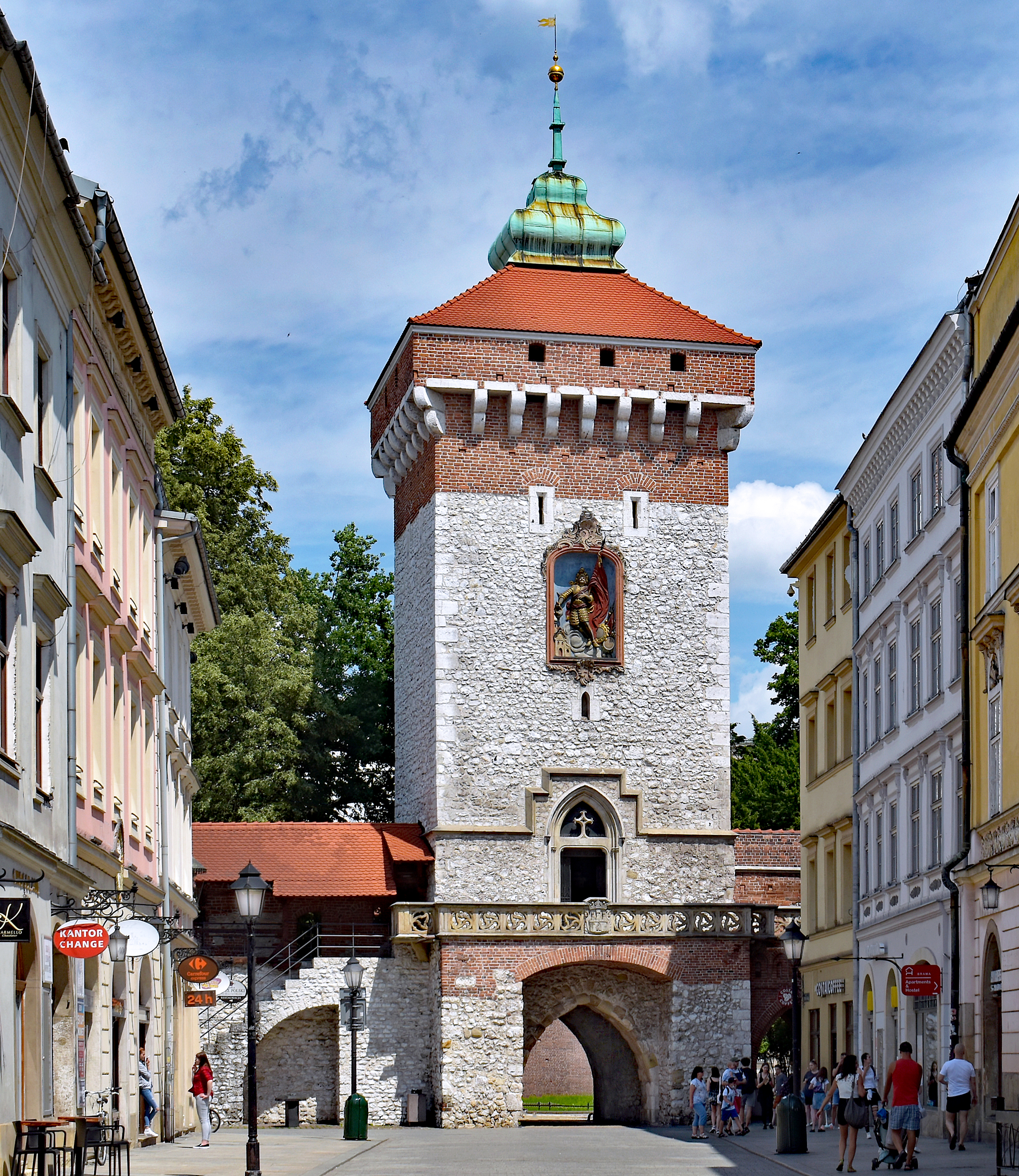
St. Florian's Gate

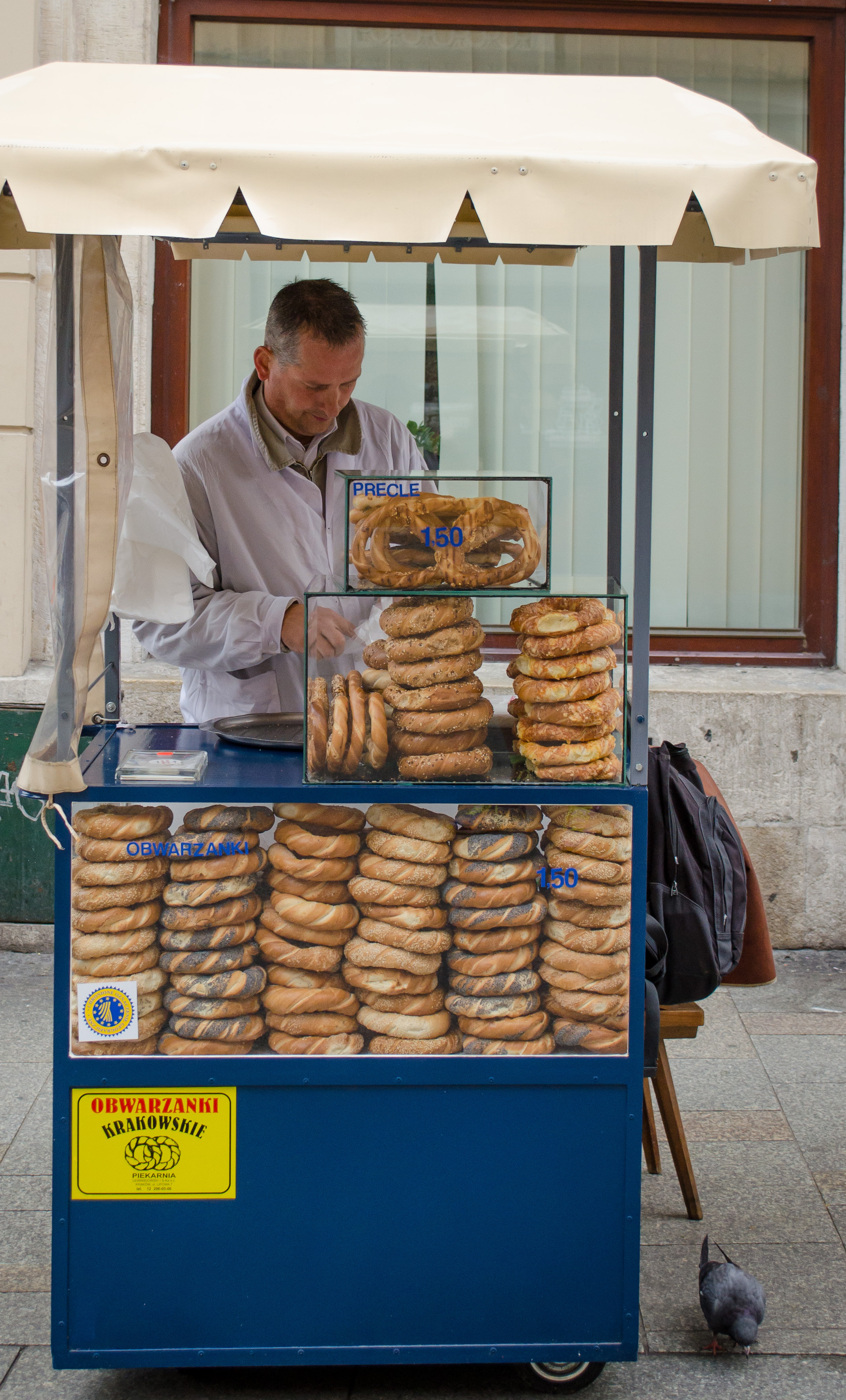
Obwarzanki krakowskie salesman in Kraków Old Town

In the 19th century most of the Old Town fortifications were demolished. The moat encircling the walls was filled in and turned into a green belt known as Planty Park.

== History ==
The first mention of Kraków dates back to the second half of the ninth century. By the end of tenth century the city was incorporated into the Polish state under the rule of Piast dynasty. The episcopal bishopric was awarded to Kraków in 1000 and around that time, it became the residence of Polish kings for centuries to come. The history of the old city of Kraków revolves mainly around its Old Town District of today. Here, the regalia were stored and, back in early Middle Ages, a cathedral school was erected.

Around 700 A.D., local tribes initiated the process of forming the Vistulan State by uniting with each other. Numerous remains of a once massive earth embankment encircling Wawel Hill survived till this day. A chest with 4,200 iron axes weighing about 4 tons was found in a basement of a house at Kanoniczna 19 street. These axes were commonly known under the name of "płacidłos" which is a word derived from the Polish verb "płacić" – to pay. As it happens the axes were a main legal tender in the neighboring Great Moravian State. The value of the treasure chest is the greatest to be discovered thus far and testifies to Kraków's significant wealth and power in the region. At Wawel's foot, in the place where now Kanoniczna, Grodzka and other neighboring streets are located, remains of a Vistulan settlement called Okół were found. This settlement, the beginnings of which can be dated at least back to the early ninth century, was surrounded by an enormous oak palisade and, in the place where now the Straszewska and St. Gertrude's streets run, by one of Vistula's arms. Near Main Market Square – specifically near Church of St. Wojciech and Church of St. Mary and Bracka street – another discovery was made. Found here were the relics of craft workshops and of dwelling houses which were originally raised near Vistula. What is more, under St. Wojciech's Church parts of a wooden temple were discovered. In those days Vistula had many arms which in turn formed several little islands in Kraków's centre. Kazimierz was one of such islands. It is also possible that Okół, Wawel and the Main Market Square were islands separated from the mainland by moats or Vistula's arms. Also, many structures were found on Wawel but it is extremely difficult to establish when they were built.

The bishops residing at Wawel and the prince's court provided a strong intellectual atmosphere. Since the 14th century, Kraków was the site of royal coronations. Under Casimir III the Great the Jagiellonian University, one of Europe's oldest institutions of higher learning, was founded.

In 1386 the Polish throne was entrusted to Lithuanian prince Władysław Jagiełło, husband of Queen Jadwiga. Jagiełło founded the next Polish dynasty, the Jagiellon dynasty. Kraków instantly became the capital of a large monarchy which propelled the city's political and cultural development. Many great artists did their work in Kraków at that time.

=== Renaissance ===
The Old Town saw considerable development during the Renaissance. During this period Wawel Cathedral was rebuilt to include the architectural features of the Italian Renaissance. Bona Sforza, the second wife of Sigismund I of Poland, asked Bartolommeo Berrecci, Francisco the Florentian, Giovanni Maria Padovano, Santi Gucci and others to do this task. As a result, Kanoniczna Street became a part of the Old Town. It carries many features that are typical for that period. With the passing of the last Jagiellon king, the political life of Poland began to move to Warsaw.

=== Baroque ===
The Baroque Era emerged in the beginning of the 17th century. In Poland Sigismund III became a prominent patron of the arts. Under his direction, architect Giovanni Trevano worked in Kraków and redesigned the Church of Saints Peter and Paul in a Baroque style. During that period the Old Town was destroyed twice during a Swedish invasion. Towards the end of the 17th century, the Church of St. Anne was built as was the Church of St. Casimir the Prince, known for its catacombs.

During the first half of the 18th century, some outstanding works of art were created by fine architects including Kacper Bażanka and Franciszek Placidi. The culture of the Baroque era left a lasting mark on this part of the city. Gothic churches were converted into the spirit of the Baroque era and were fitted with new altars, sculptures, and paintings.

In 1794, the armies of Tadeusz Kościuszko rallied to defend Poland against foreign partitions. The Kościuszko Uprising ended with their defeat, and in 1795 Poland underwent its final partition, after which Kraków became a part of the Austro-Hungarian Empire. In spite of these political developments, Kraków in a sense remained important for Polish patriots. The city's many cultural monuments became national memorials and the only representation of national identity for the next century.

=== Foreign rule ===
In the 19th century, Austrian Emperor Franz I decided to liquidate the long-neglected city fortifications. The liquidation was carried out during the time of the Duchy of Warsaw. Thanks to the efforts of Professor Feliks Radwański, the northern part of the walls were saved, including the Barbican, the Florian Gate and three towers which once marked the starting point of the Royal Road along which a new monarch would parade to the place of his coronation at Wawel Cathedral. The Planty Park was created in the place of the destroyed fortifications.

During this period the Juliusz Słowacki Theatre was constructed. It is located at Holy Ghost Square. The theatre was built in place of an old hospital that was run by the Order of the Holy Ghost. The building is an example of the Polish Eclectic architectural style. In 1850 a fire spread through the city and caused substantial damages.

In 1876 prince Władysław Czartoryski gave the city some of his artistic and patriotic collections. Three years later, the National Museum in Kraków was established. Kraków became the centre of museology in Poland. Famous artists such as Jan Matejko and Stanisław Wyspiański worked in the Old Town, which was also the place where numerous political independence movements were born.

=== Wartime ===
On 6 September 1939, German forces entered Kraków. The city became the capital of the General Government. The oppression of Jews began and a concentration camp was created in Plaszow. The Old Town was plundered and many works of art were stolen. Museums, schools and theatres were closed. Professors were arrested. Jewish synagogues were devastated, despoiled of ceremonial objects and turned into storehouses for ammunition, firefighting equipment and Nazi general storage sites.

On 18 January 1945, the Soviet forces of the 2nd Ukrainian Front under the command of Marshal Ivan Konev entered Kraków and forced the German army to withdraw. Kraków emerged as a city in the newly established People's Republic of Poland.

== The Old Town today ==
Today the Old Town attracts visitors from all over the world. The historic centre is one of 17 places in Poland that are included on the UNESCO World Heritage Sites. The architectural design of the Old Town has survived many cataclysms of the past and has retained the original form that was established in medieval times.

Throughout the year the Old Town is visited frequently. There are many tourists, florists, and lined up horse-drawn carriages waiting to give a ride. It contains the Main Market Square, one of the biggest squares in Europe, which came into existence when the city was given Magdeburg Rights in 1257. Tourist attractions such as the Town Hall Tower, the Sukiennice (also known as the Cloth Hall), old tenements with fine shops, and Adam Mickiewicz Monument are all located there. While near the monument, one can listen to the heynal, which is played each hour from the highest tower of St. Mary's Church.

There are many cafes, pubs and clubs, which are located in medieval basements and cellars with vaulted ceilings. The most famous places include "Wierzynek" Restaurant and Club "Pod Jaszczurami". Numerous events, concerts and exhibitions are organized there.

Obwarzanki krakowskie, or twisted ring-shaped breads, are undoubtedly a symbol of Kraków. On the Square there is a obwarzanki seller every few steps. Traditional obwarzanki are sprinkled with poppy-seeds. Today, sellers offer a whole variety of them; apart from poppy-seed, there are also sesame seed, rock salt and even pizza sprinkles. One can eat them while strolling or in a horse-drawn carriage while cruising around and glancing at yet another symbol of the old city, namely Kraków pigeons. One can also come across various buskers and mimes.

Numerous legends purport to explain the presence of numerous pigeons on the Main Square. According to one legend, Henry IV Probus, who tried to take over the Senioral Province during the period of regional disintegration of Poland, attempted to go to Rome with financial offerings in order to gain papal approval for his coronation. However, a certain enchantress turned his knights into pigeons. They pecked out some pebbles from the walls of St. Mary's Church, which then turned into gold. With these riches the prince set off to Vatican, but while on his way he lost everything and never managed to reach his destination. He returned to Kraków. None of his knights ever regained a human form.

== Architectural monuments ==
The Old Town district of Kraków is home to about six thousand historic sites and more than two million works of art. Its rich variety of historic architecture includes Renaissance, Baroque and Gothic buildings. Kraków's palaces, churches, theatres and mansions display great variety of color, architectural details, stained glass, paintings, sculptures, and furnishings.

=== Museums and theatres ===
Many renowned points of interest in the Old Town, drawing a constant stream of visitors, include galleries as well as departments of the National Museum in Kraków such as the Sukiennice Museum, the Jan Matejko House, Czartoryski Museum with Arsenal at 19 Św. Jana Street, as well as the Historical Museum of Kraków (Rynek Główny 35) with its departments: the Barbican, the House under the Cross housing History of Theatre museum, Hippolitow House, Town Hall Tower, Archdiocesan Museum and Archaeological Museum of Kraków. There are also: the Pharmacy Museum, Collegium Modicum at Jagiellonian University, the Old Theatre Museum and the renowned Collegium Maius Museum of the Jagiellonian University, including the Palace of Bishop Erazm Ciołek (on Kanoniczna). Two major theatres are also located there: the Old Theatre, and the most famous Juliusz Słowacki Theatre.

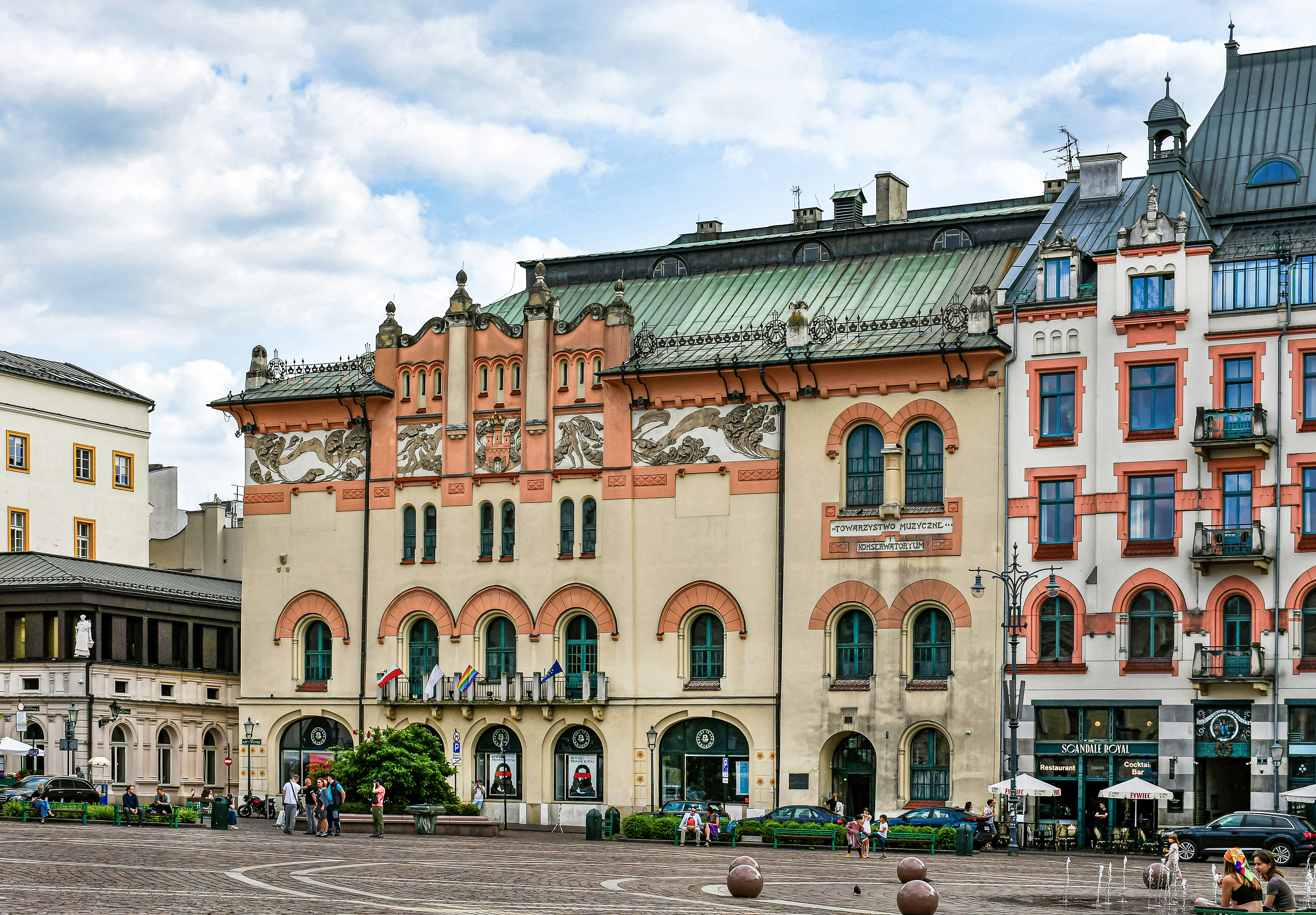
Helena Modrzejewska National Old Theatre

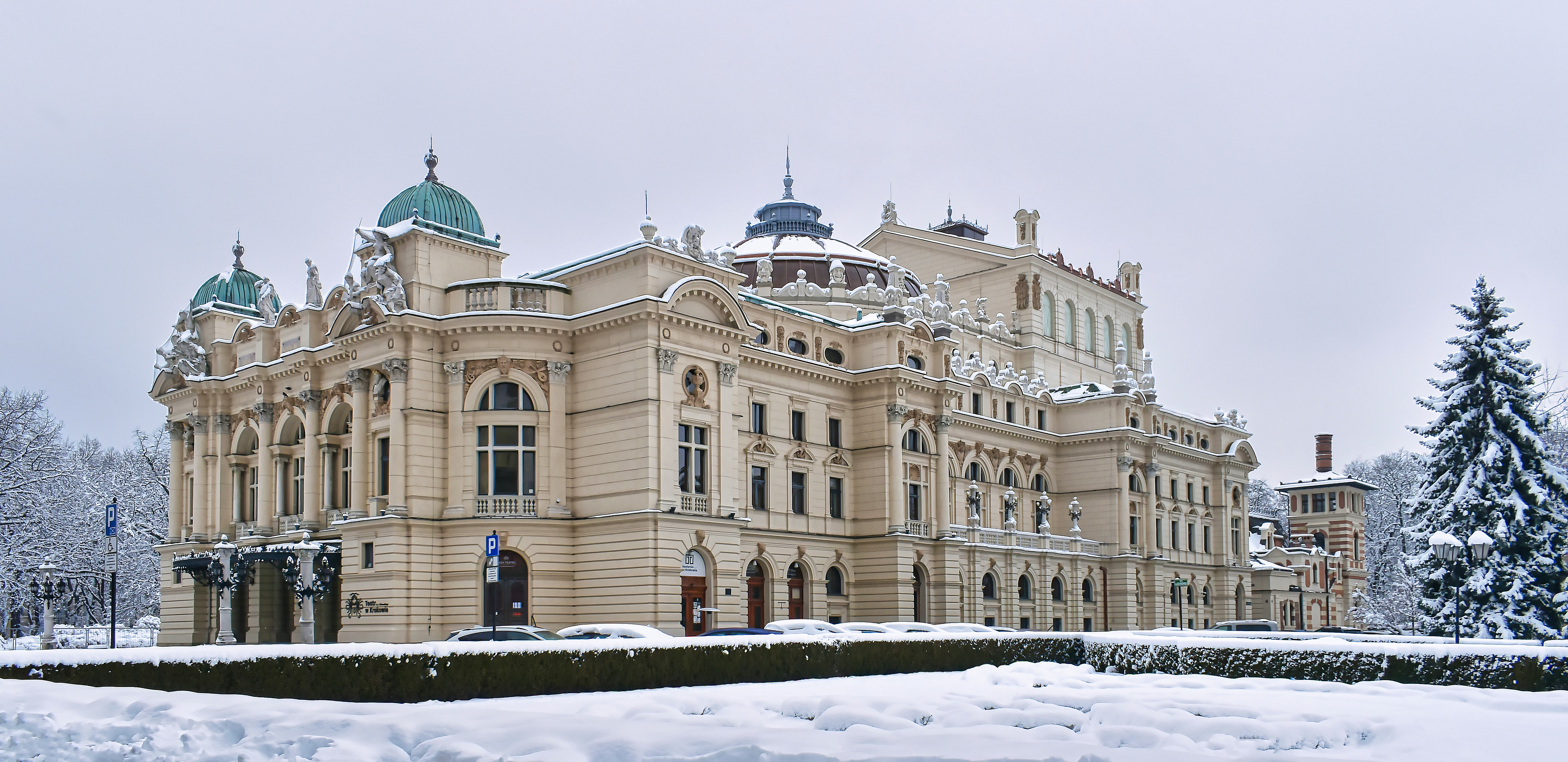
Juliusz Słowacki Theatre

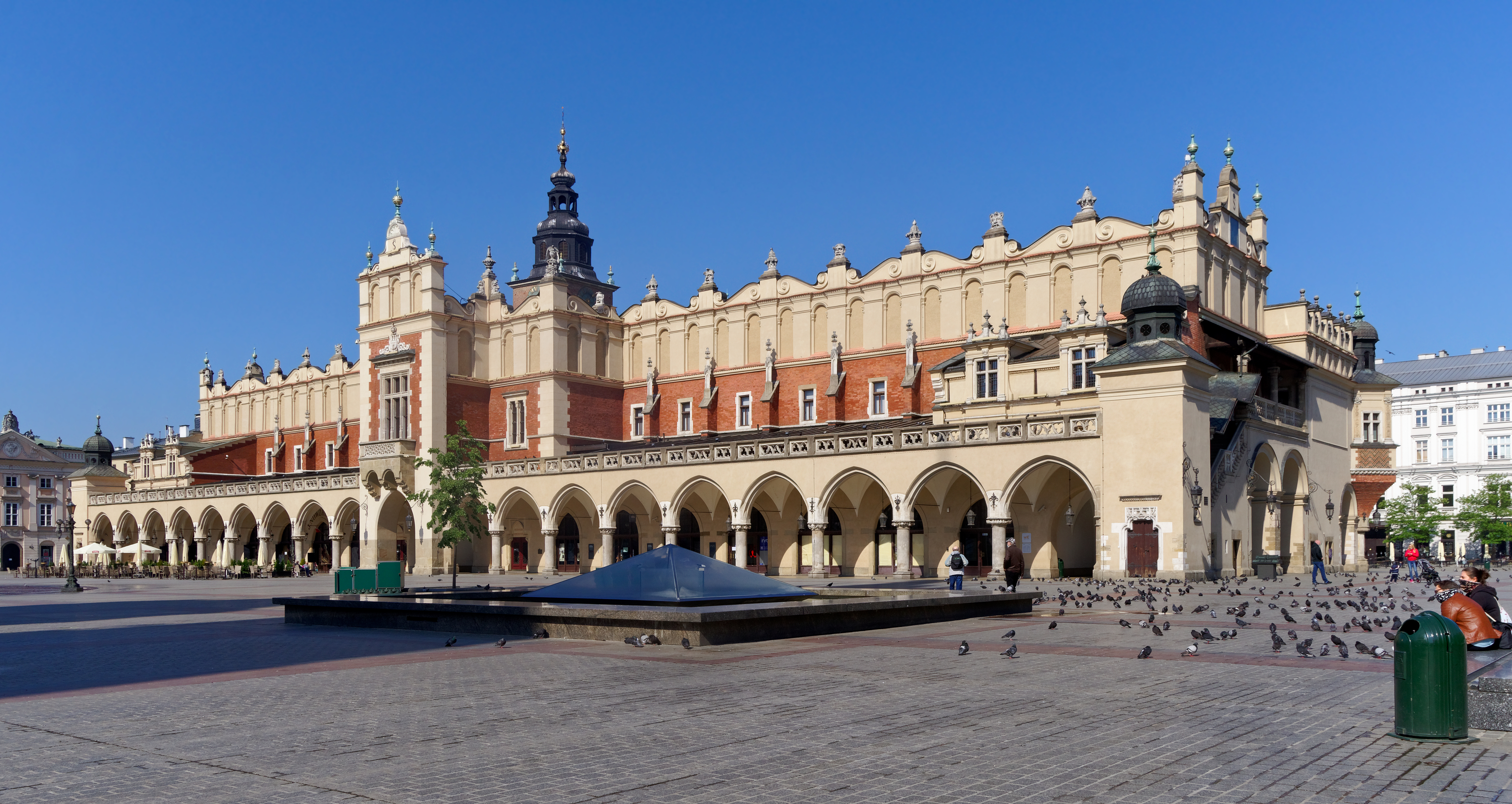
Sukiennice Museum

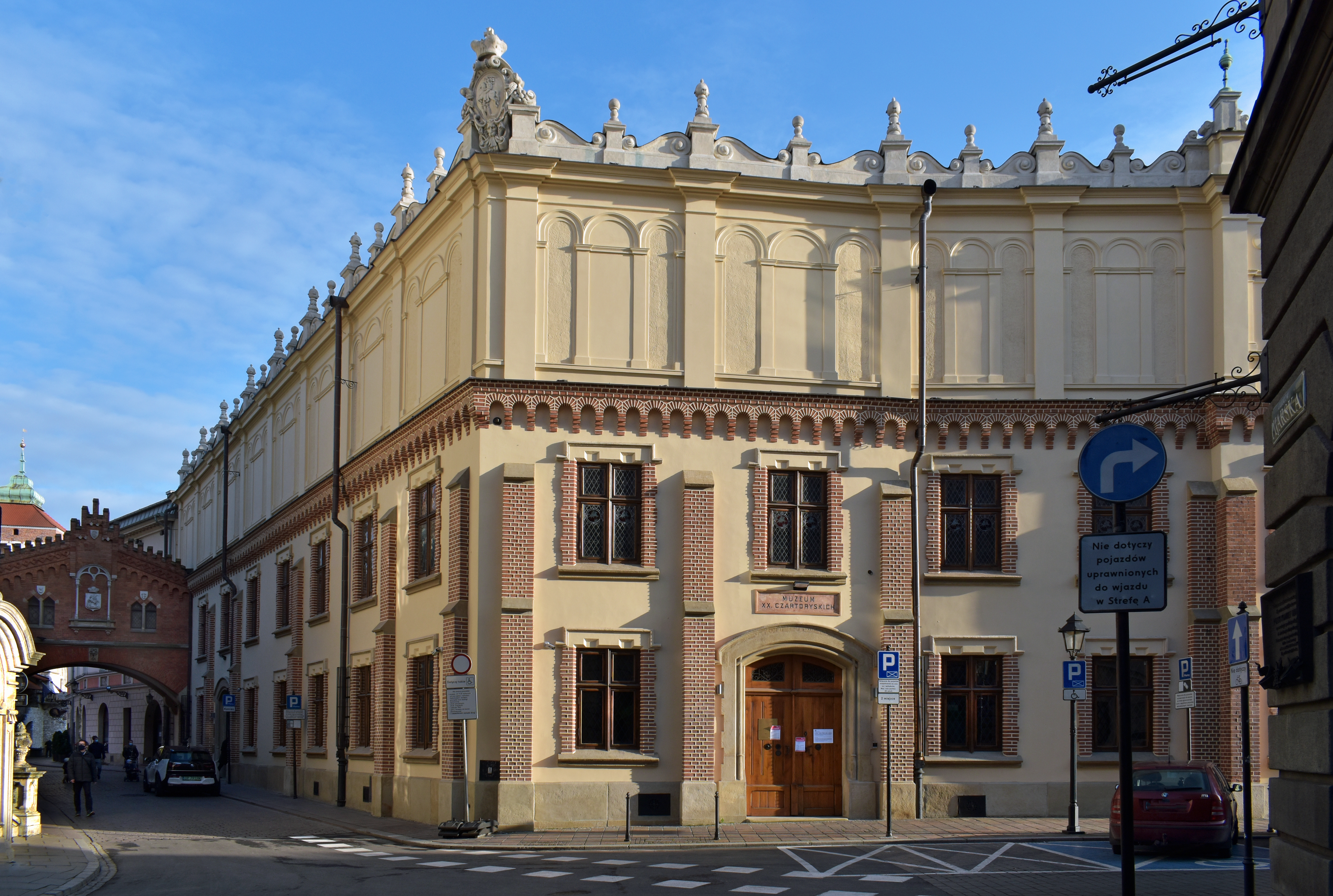
Czartoryski Museum

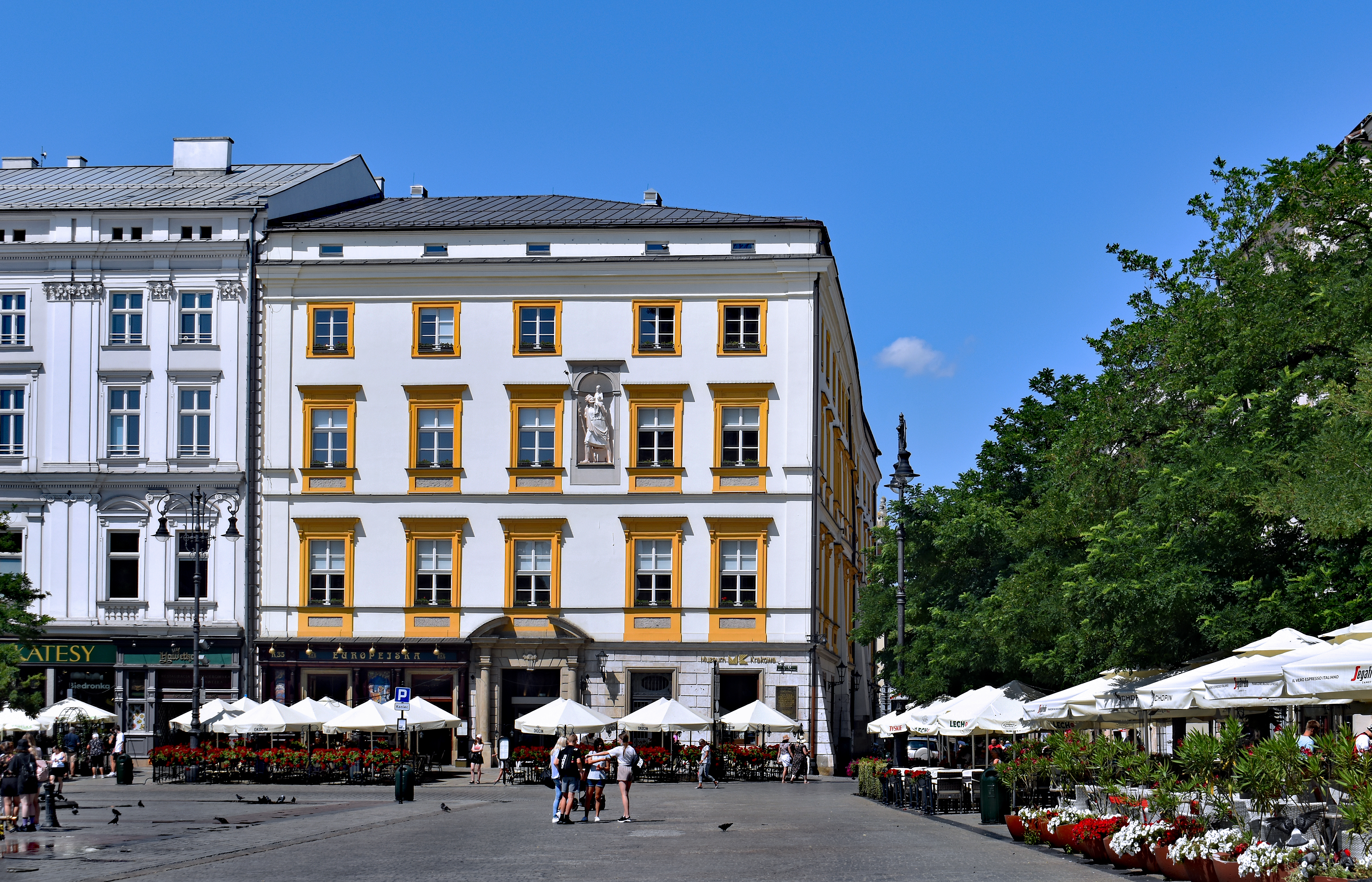
Pod Krzysztofory Palace
Historical Museum of Kraków

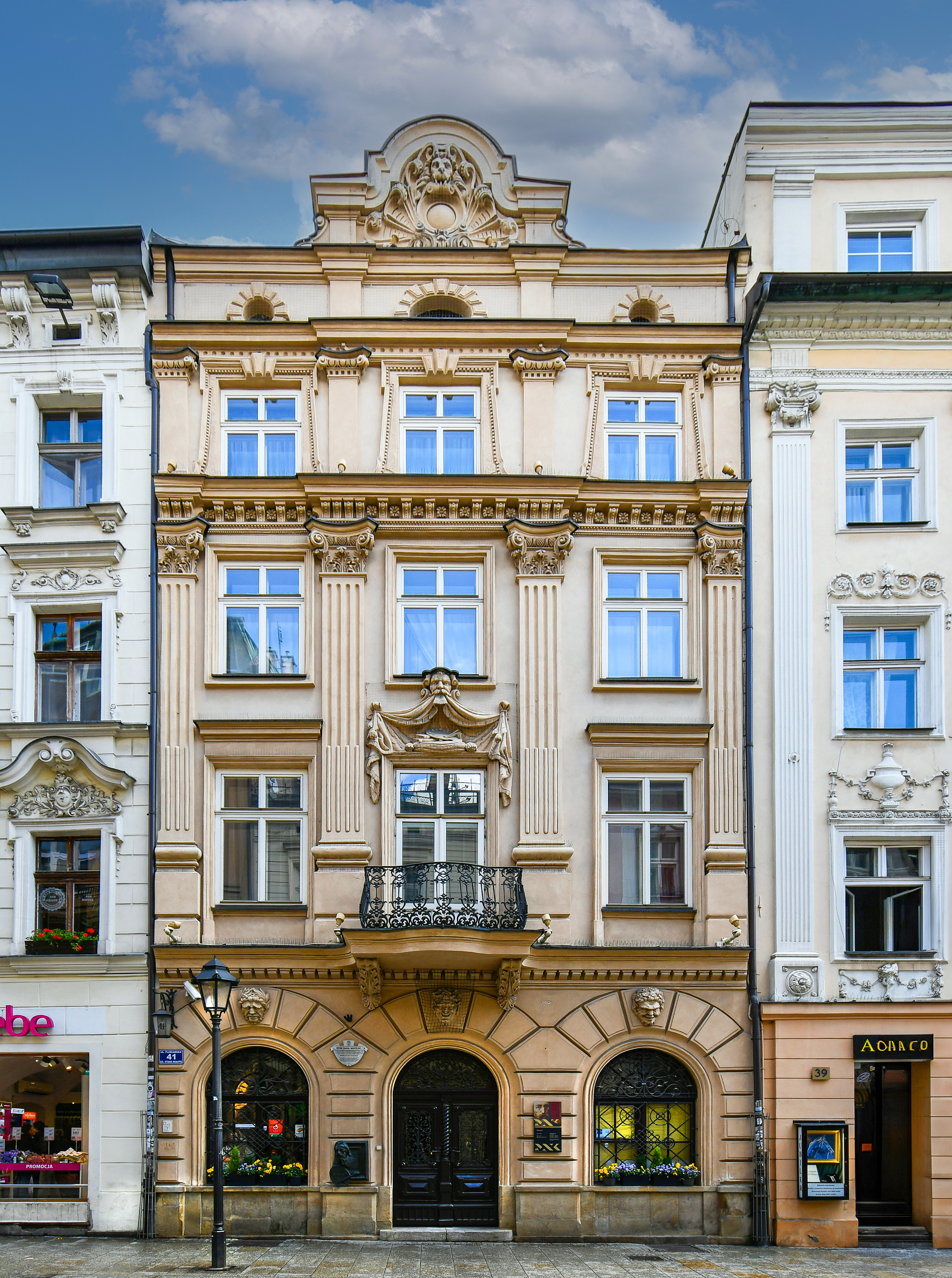
Jan Matejko House

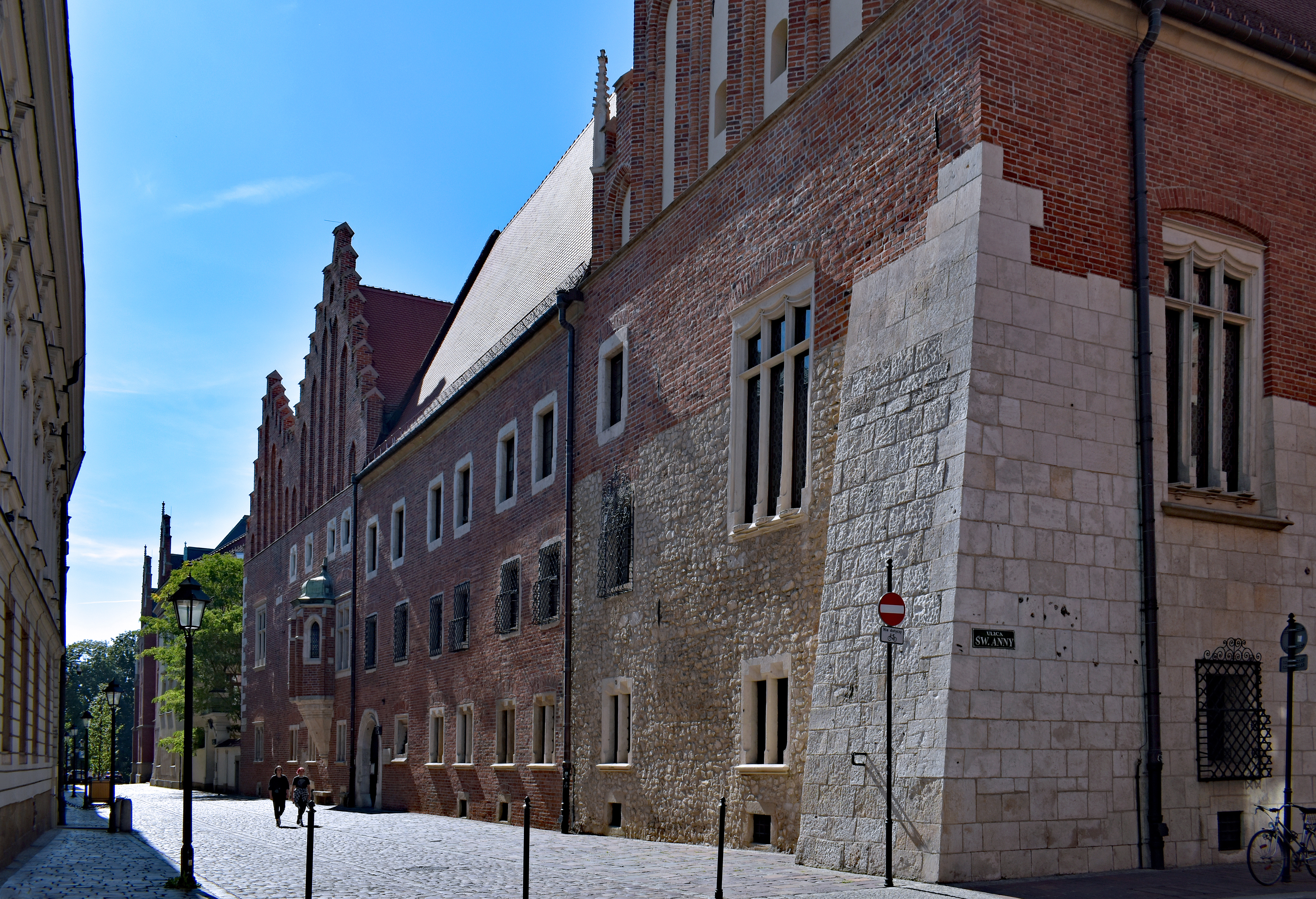
Collegium Maius
Jagiellonian University Museum

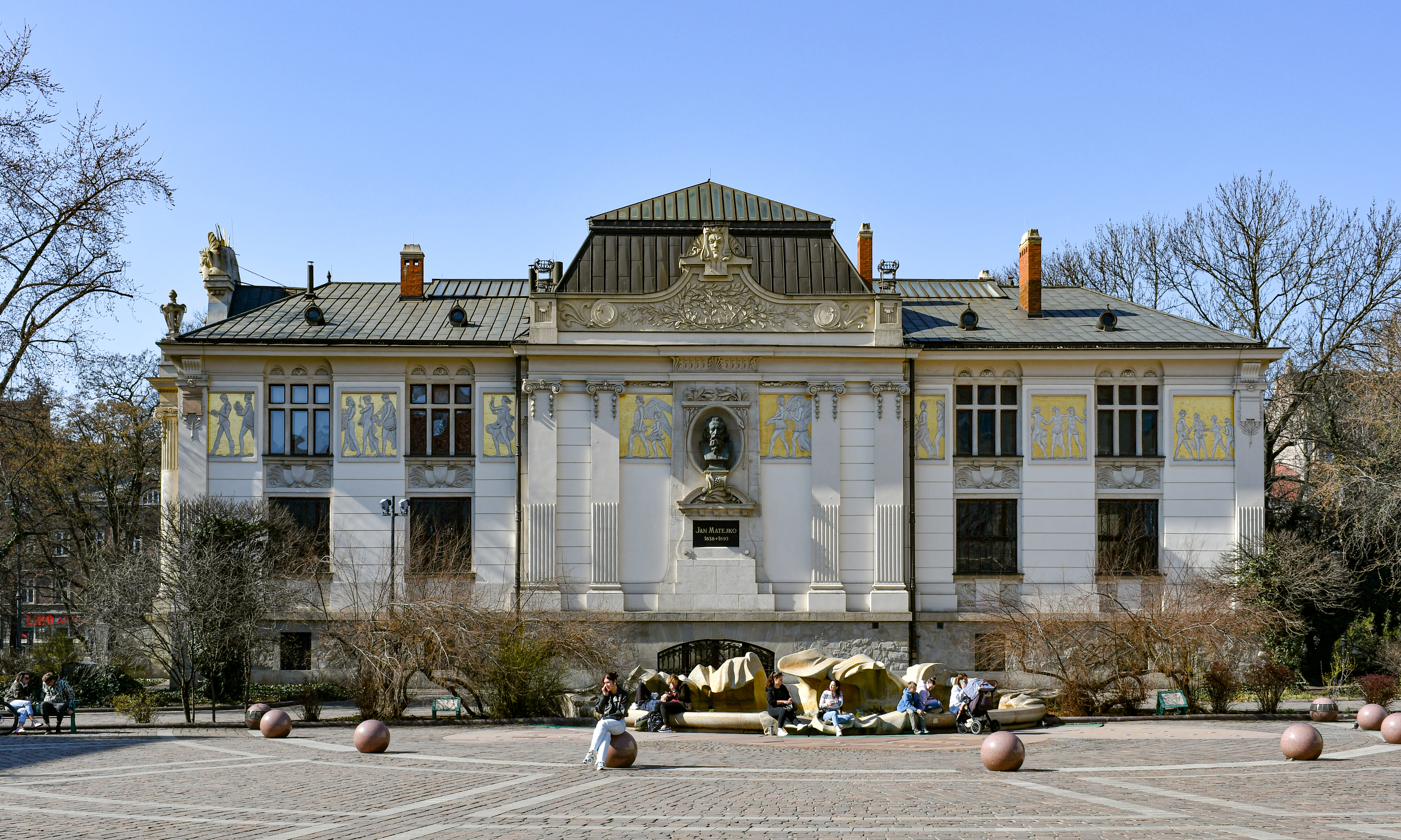
Palace of Art (Pałac Sztuki)
Kraków Society of Friends of Fine Arts

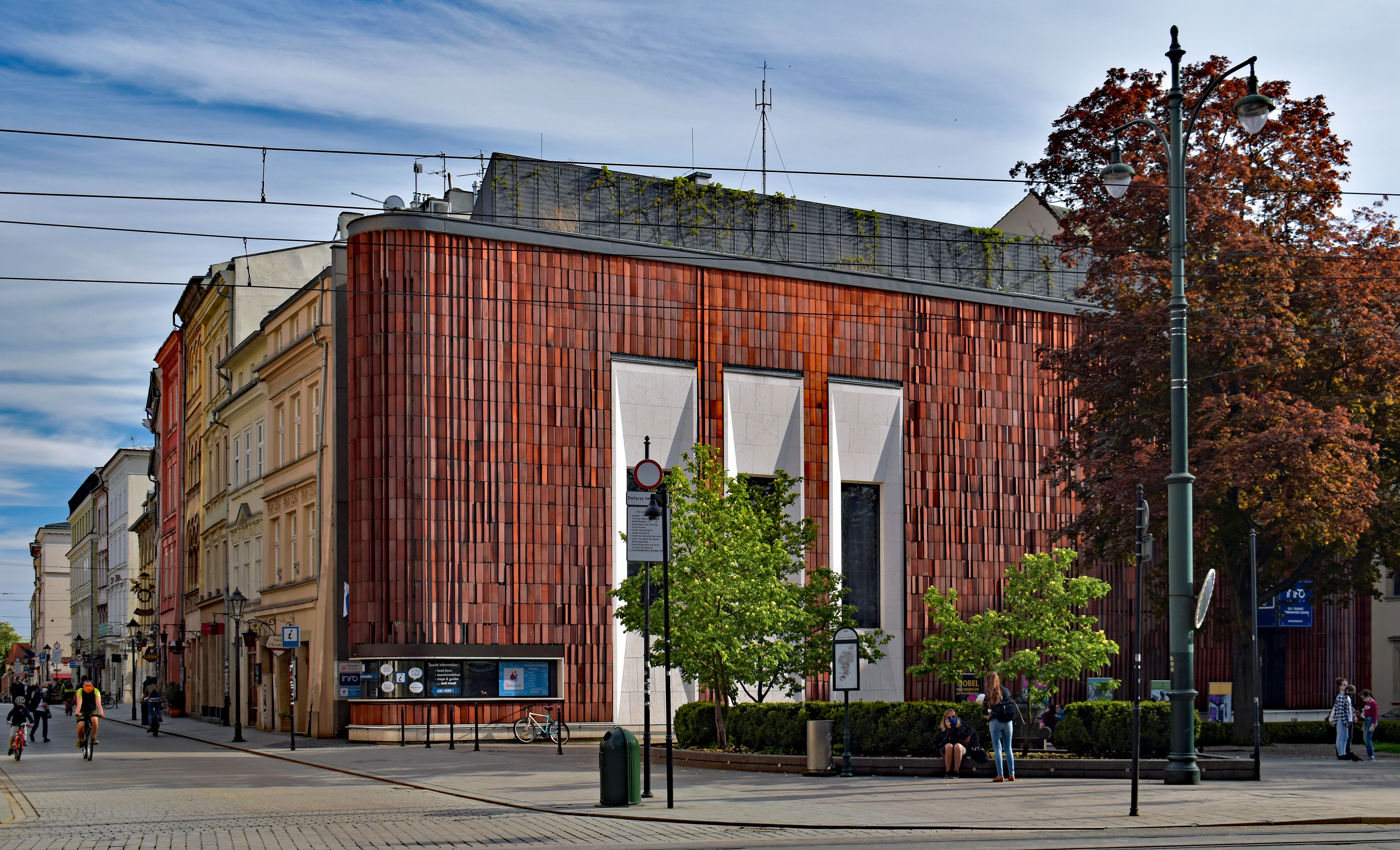
Wyspiański Pavilion

=== Churches ===
The extended list of churches in the Old Town include: Church of St. Andrew, Church of St. Ann, Church of St. Barbara, Church and Monastery of Franciscans, Church of St. Giles, St. John's The Baptist and St. John's The Evangelist Church, Reformatory Church of St. Casimir, Church of Our Lady of Snows, Church of St. Martin, Church of St. Mary, Church of St. Marc, St. Peter's and Paul's Church, Pijary Church, Church of St. Tomas, St. Trinity Church (Dominican Church) and Church of St. Wojciech.

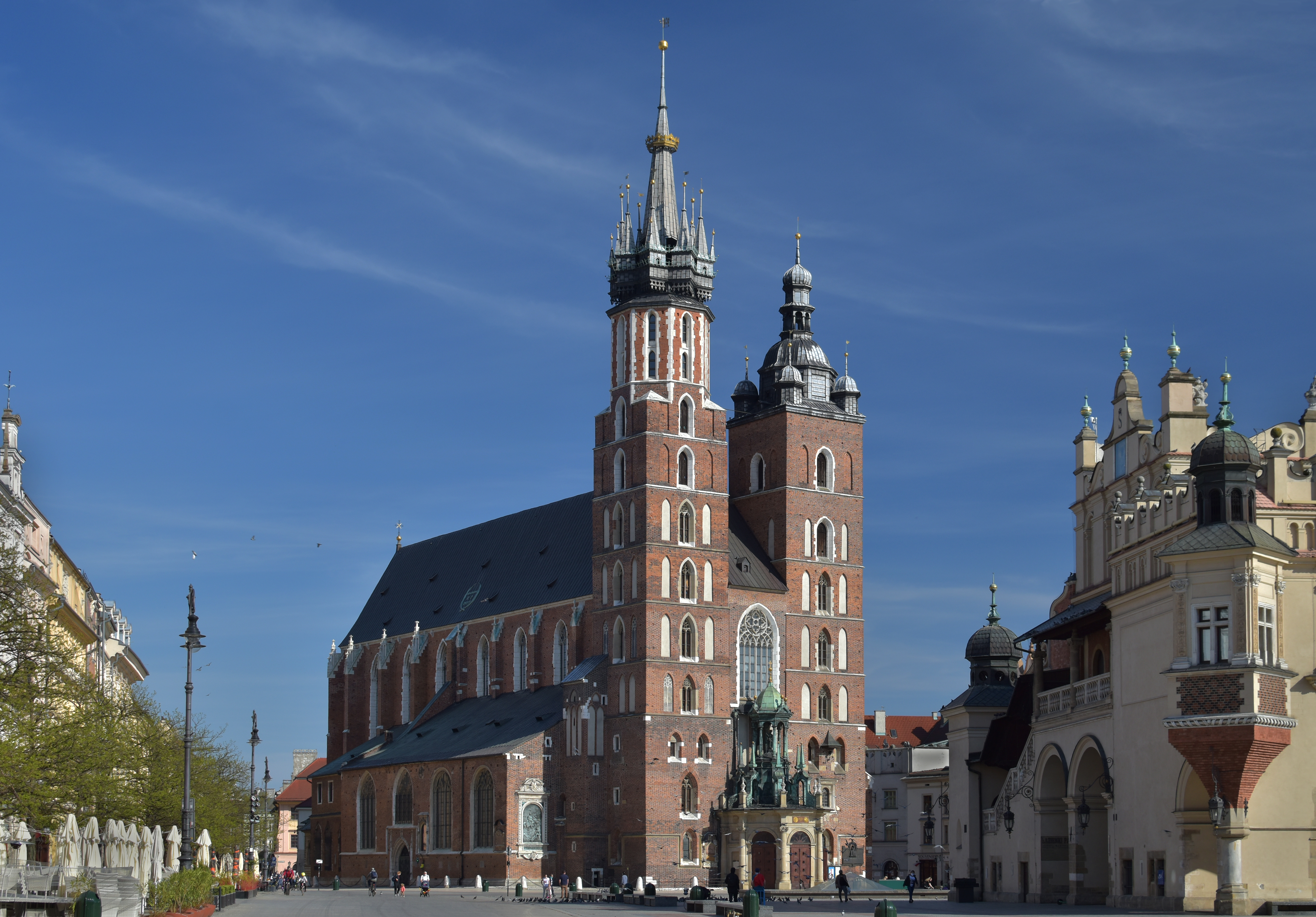
St. Mary's Church

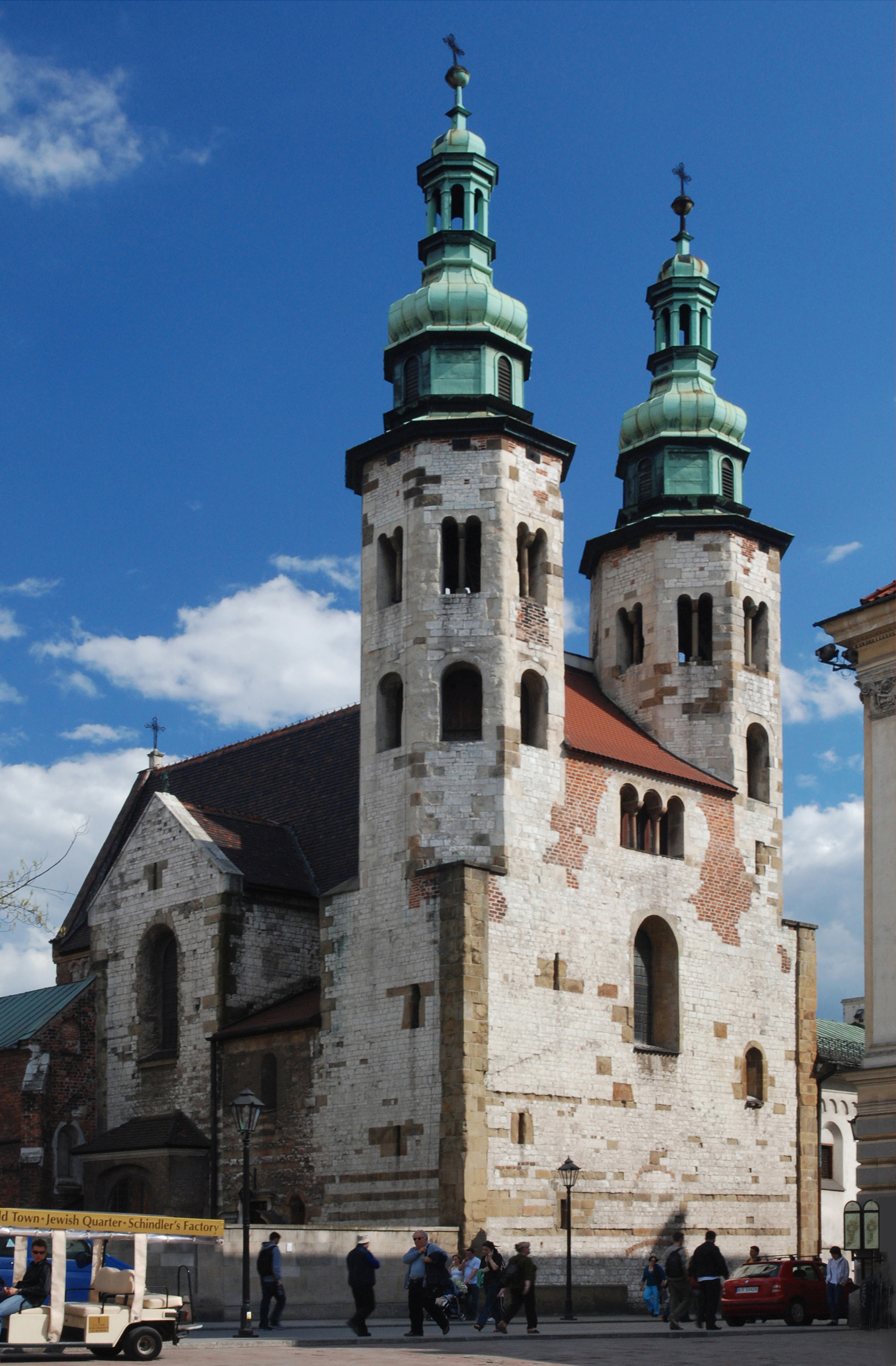
Church of St. Andrew (Poor Clares)

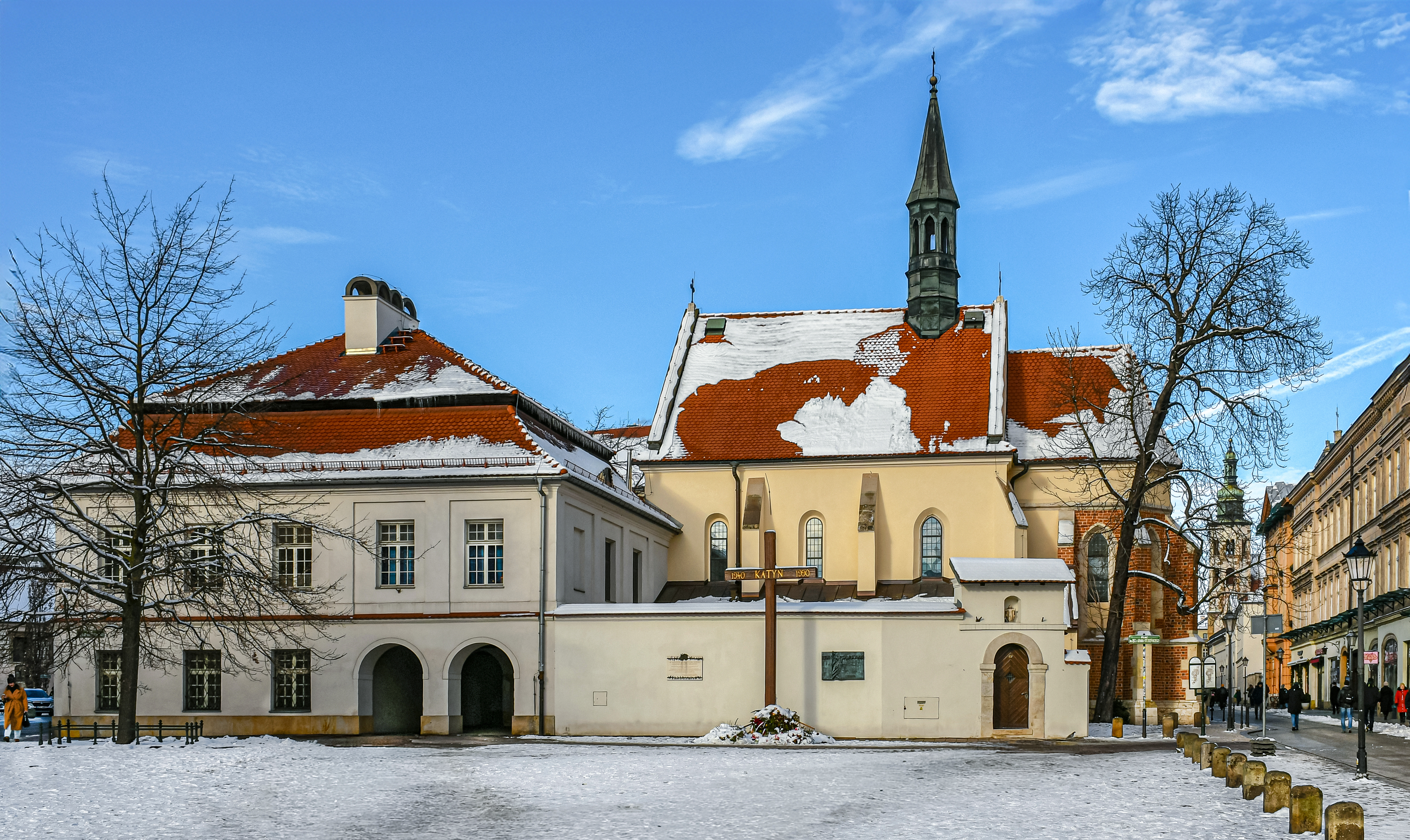
Church of St. Giles

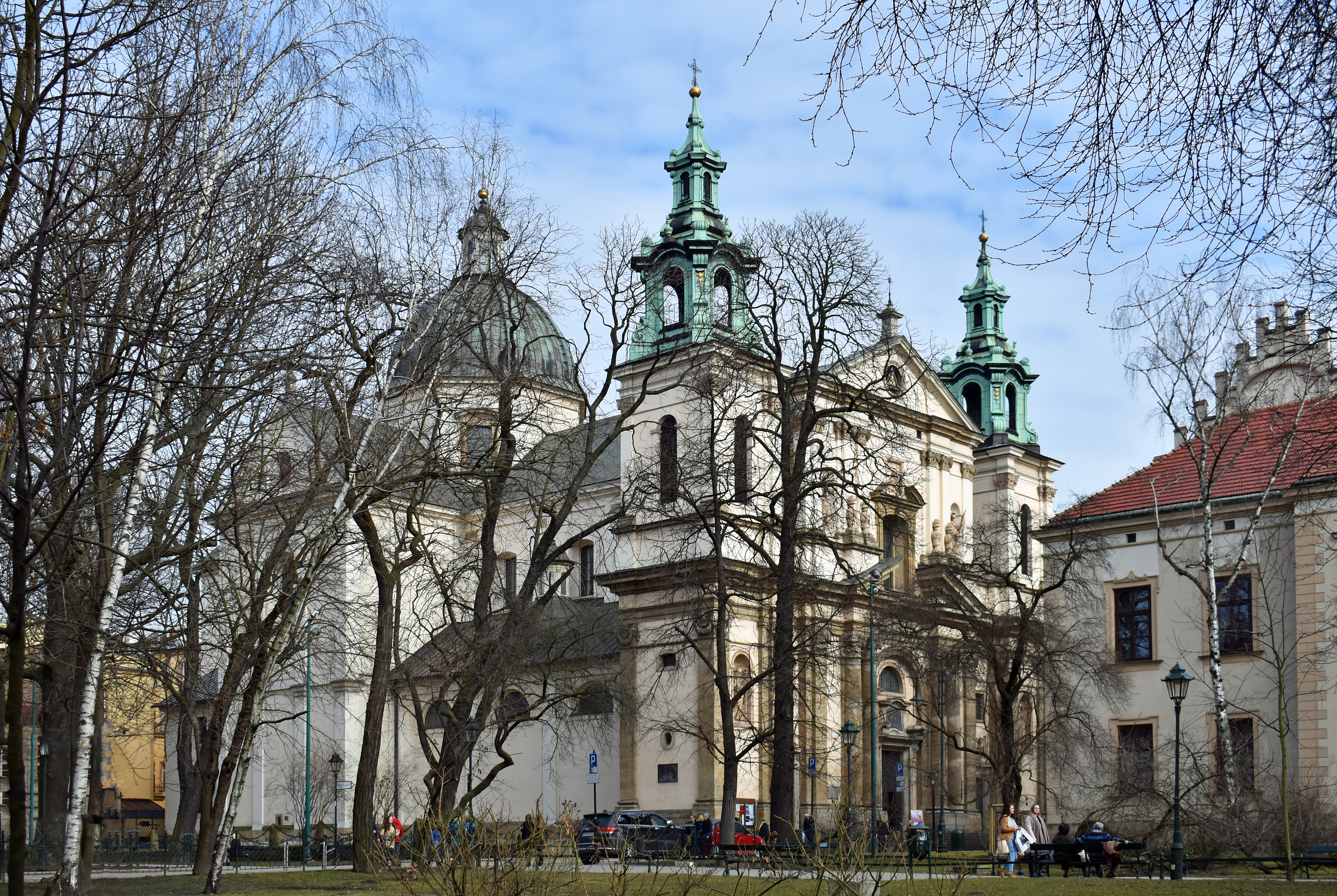
Church of St. Anne

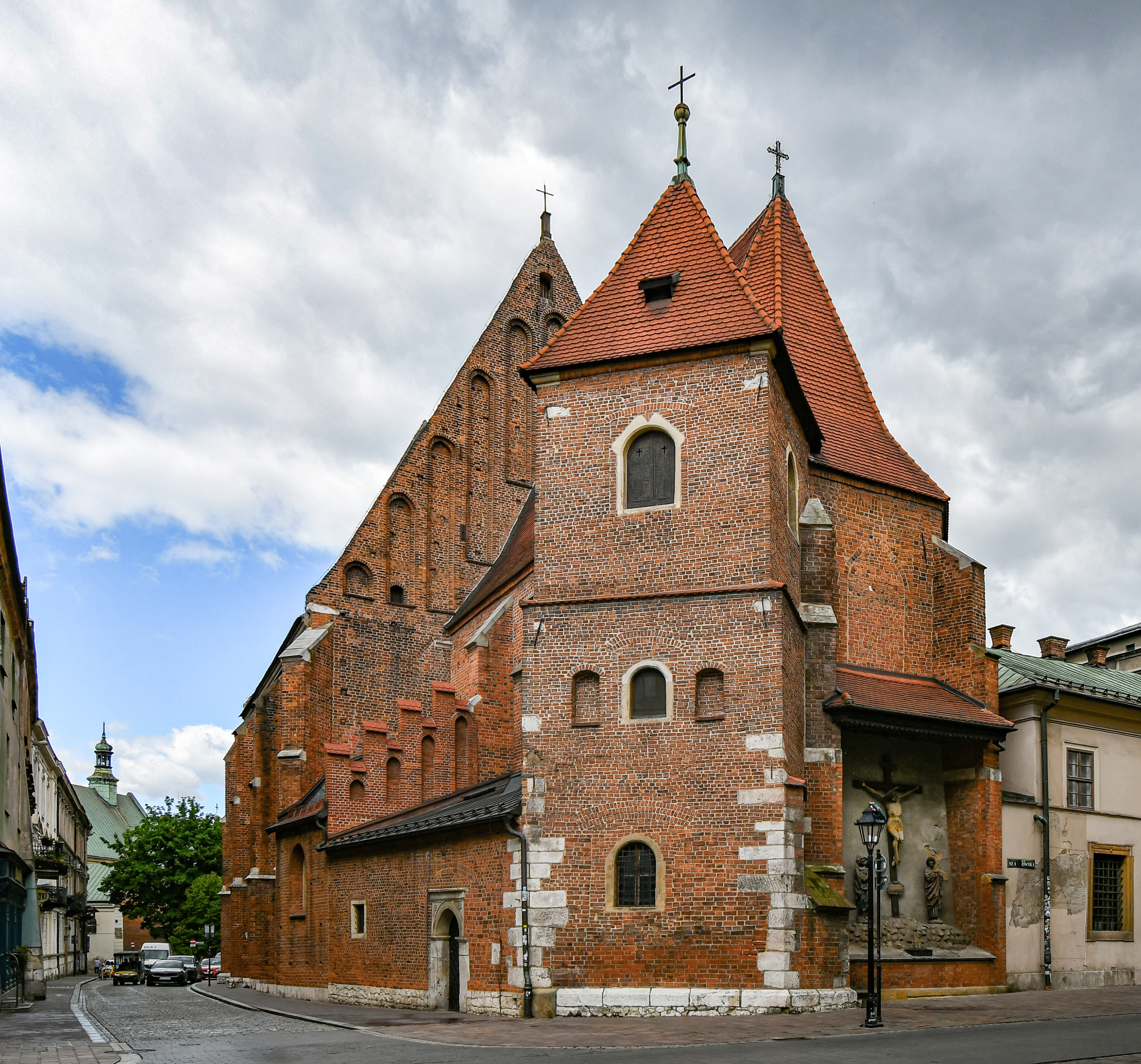
Church of St. Mark

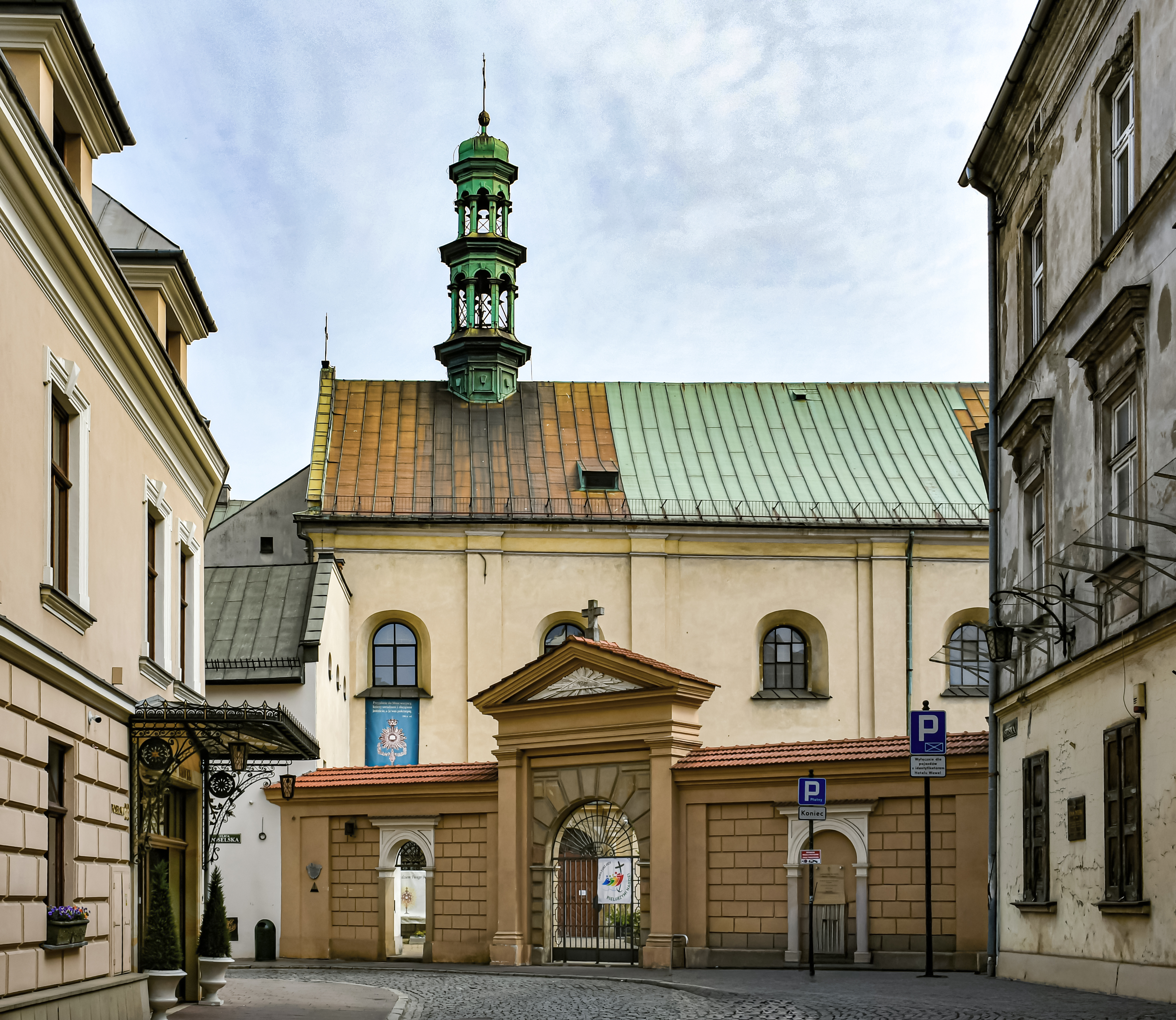
Church of St. Joseph (Bernardine Sisters)
21 Poselska Street

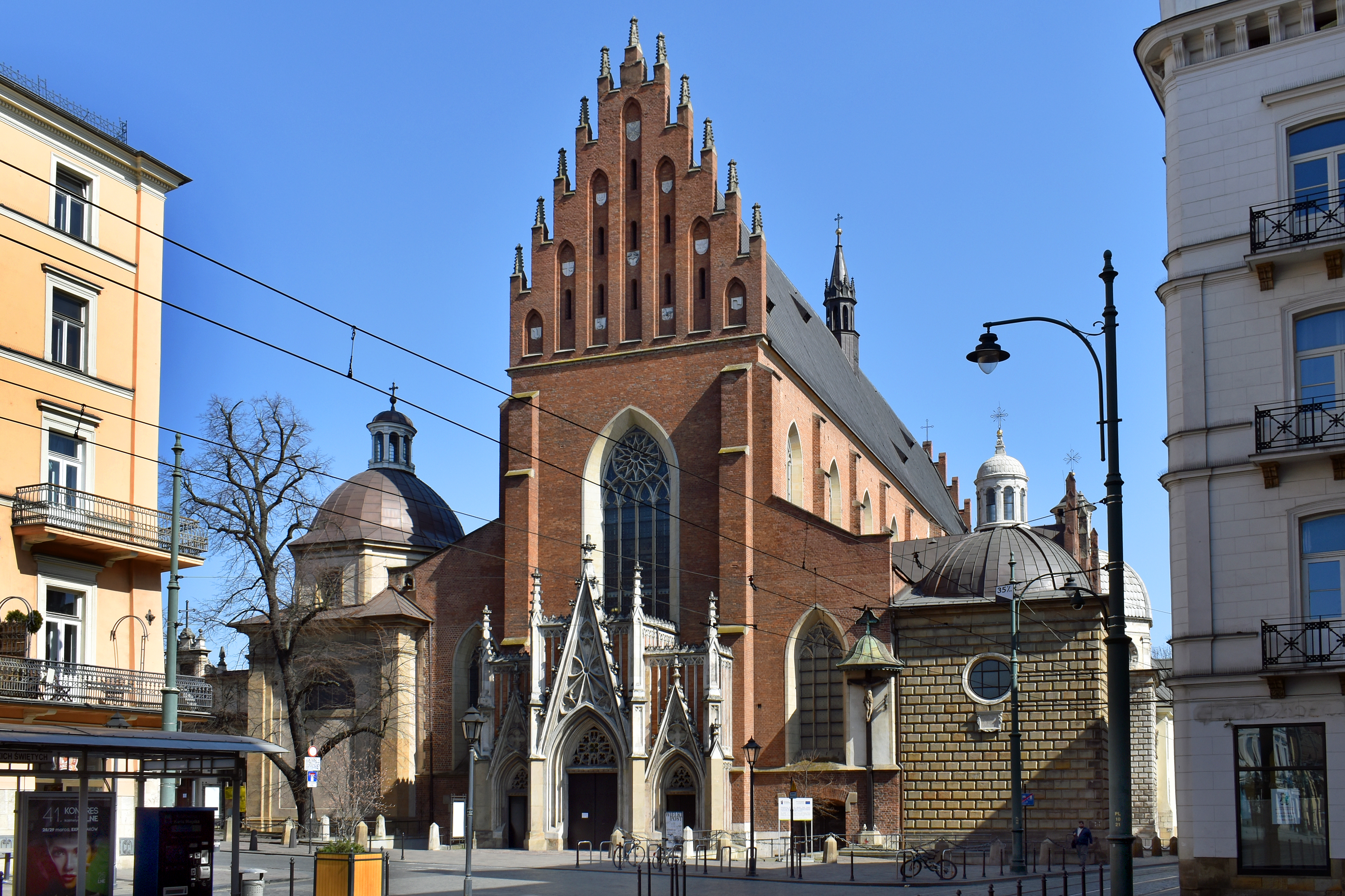
Church of Holy Trinity (Dominican)

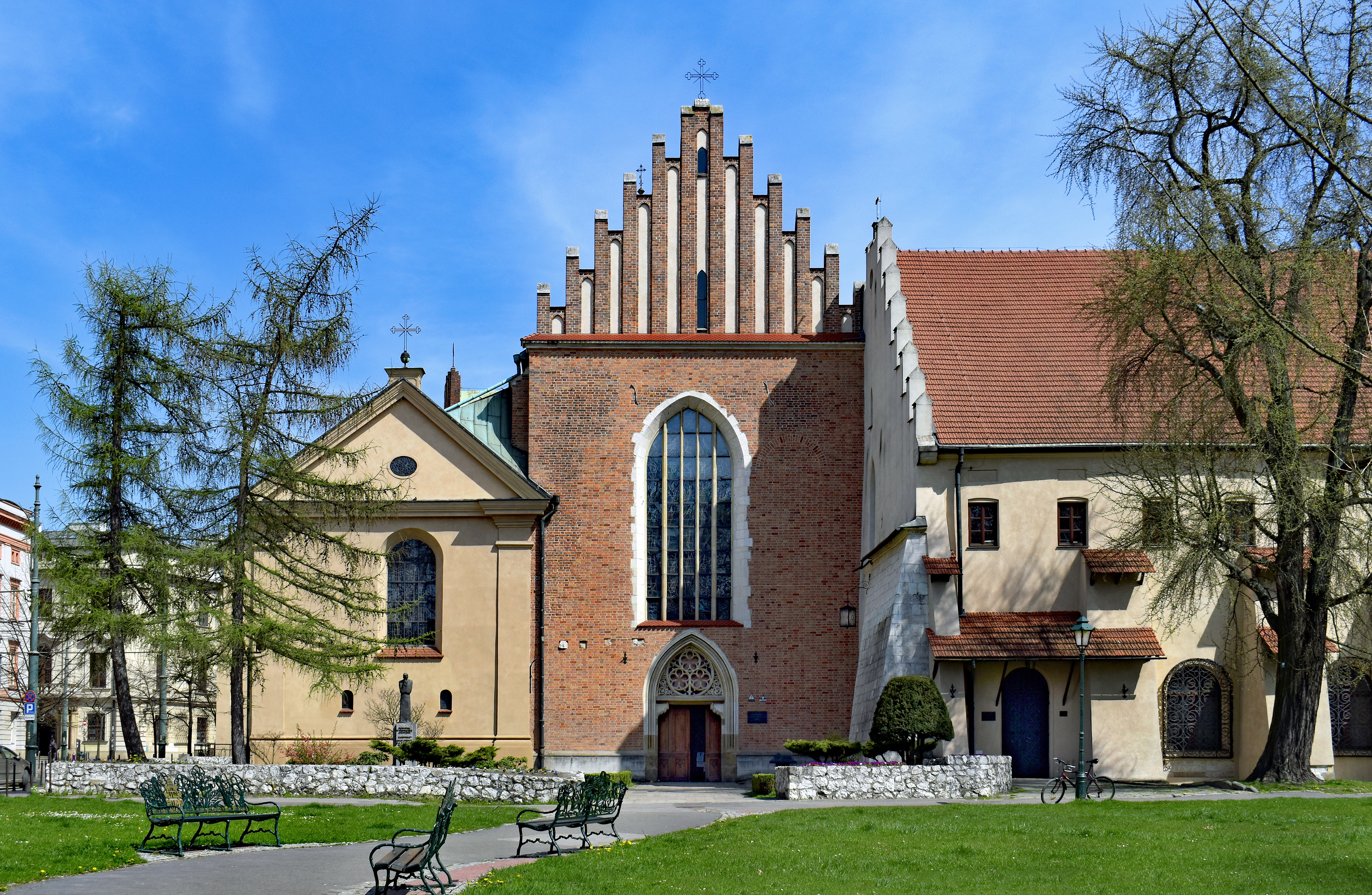
Church of St. Francis of Assisi (Franciscan)

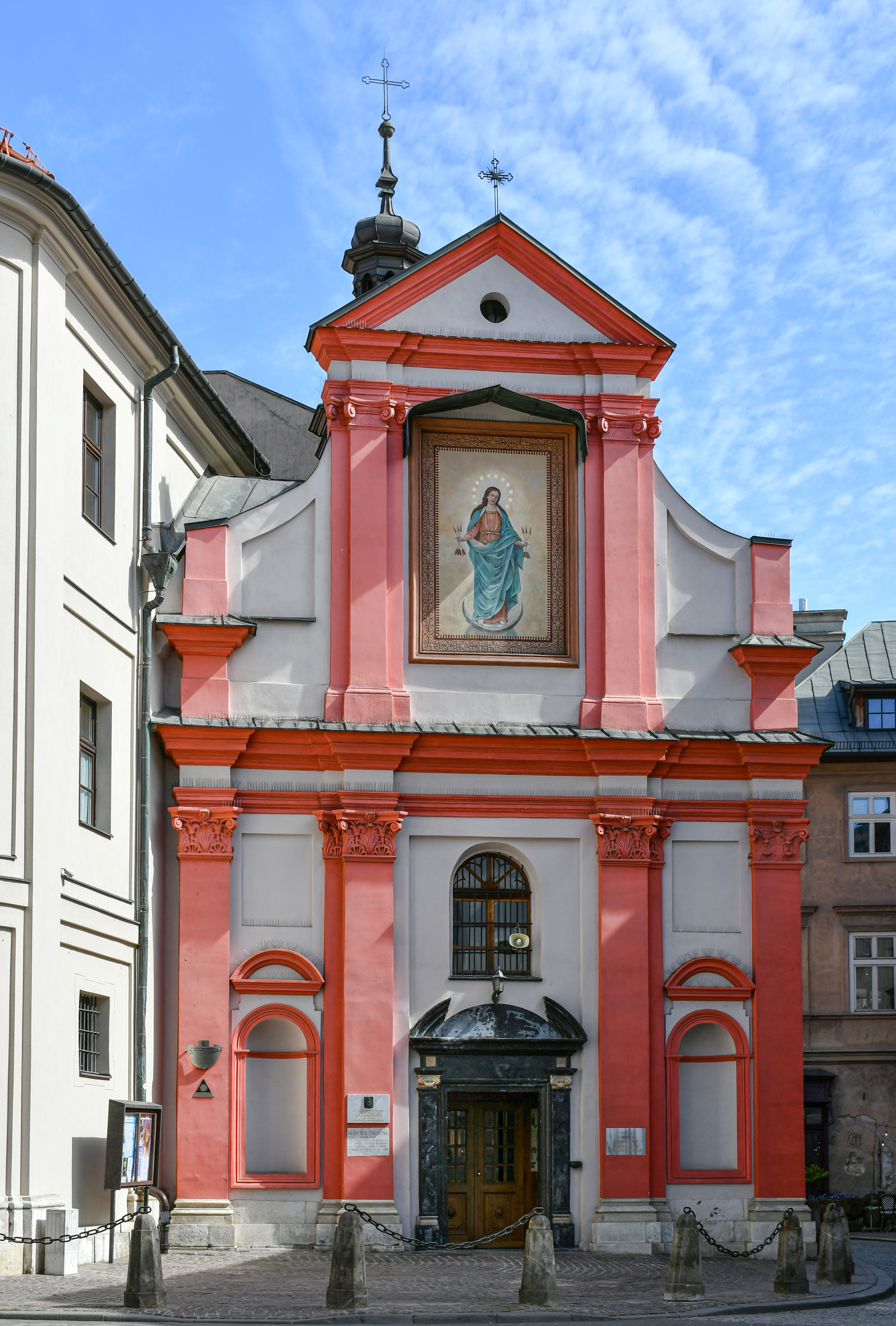
Church of St. John the Baptist and St. John the Evangelist (Presentation Sisters)

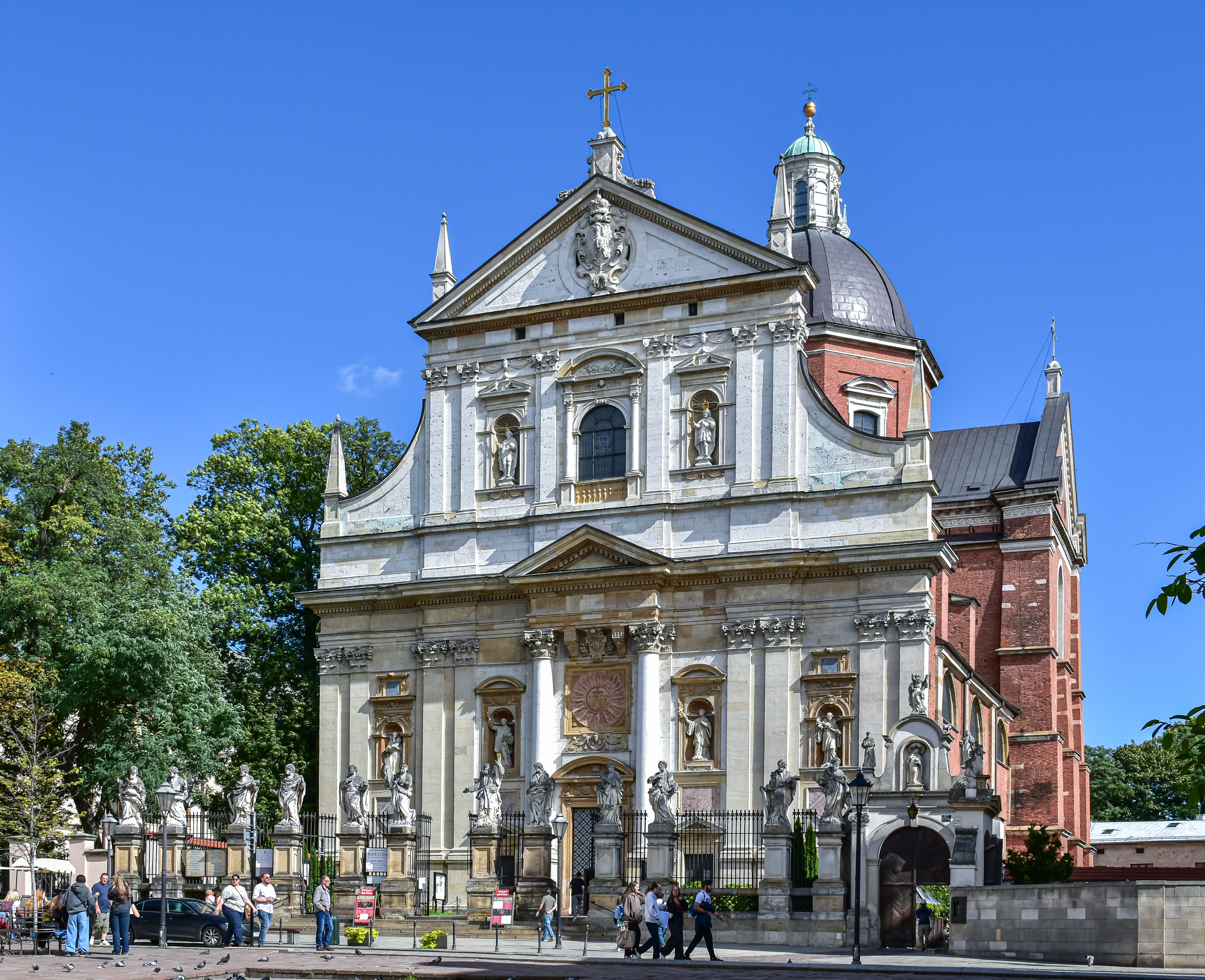
Saints Peter and Paul Church

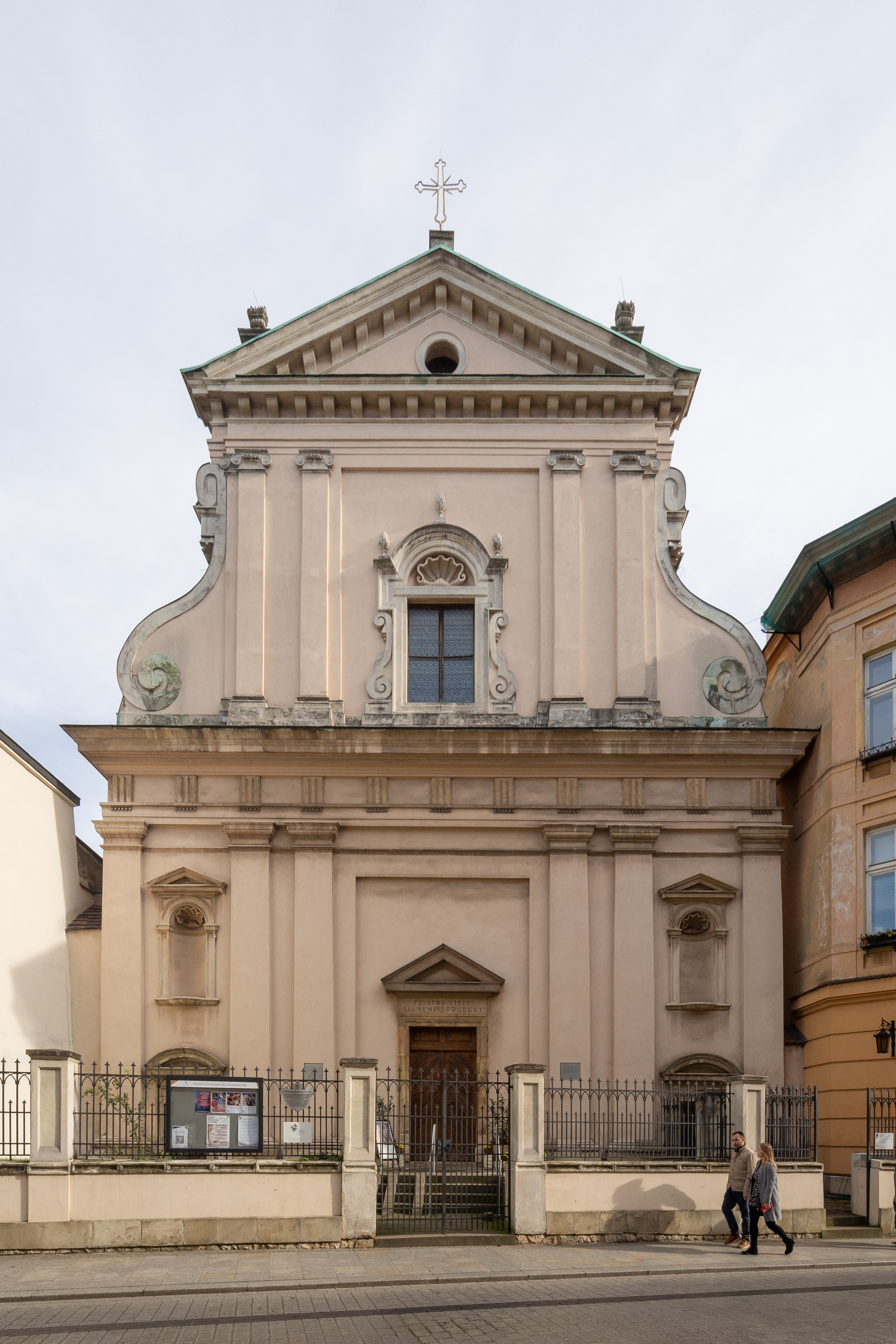
Church of St. Martin (Evangelical)

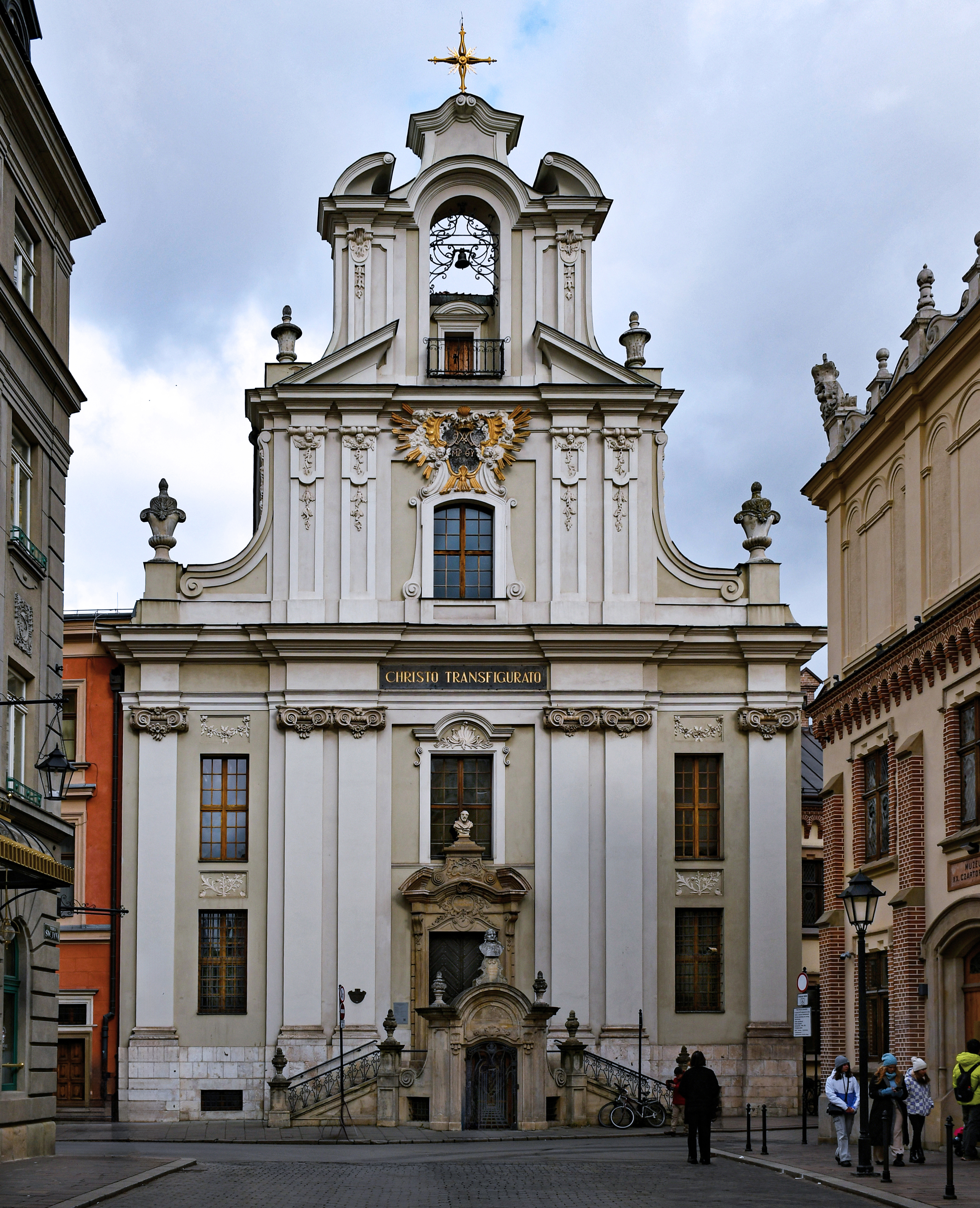
Church of the Transfiguration (Piarist)

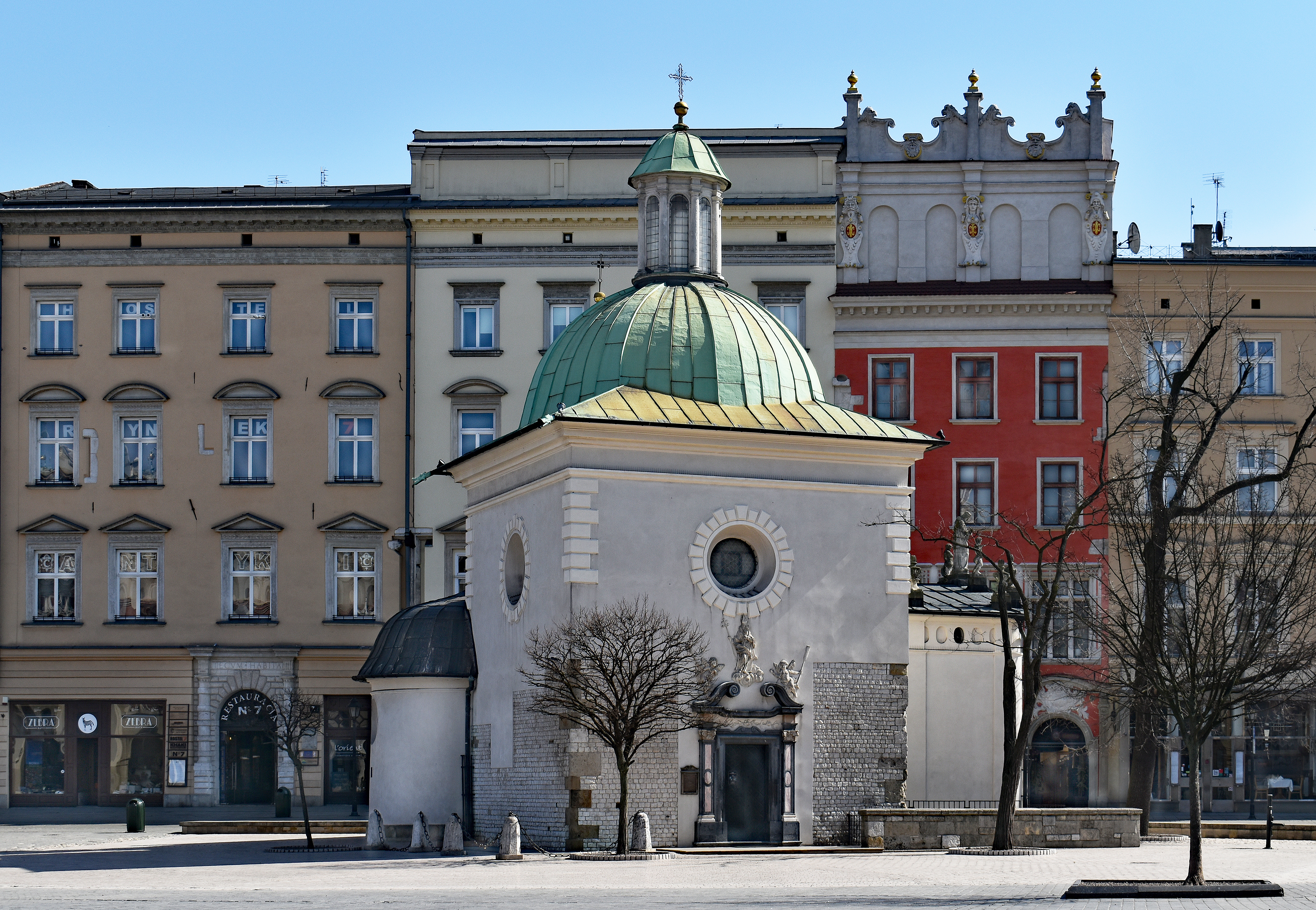
Church of St. Wojciech
2 Main Market Square

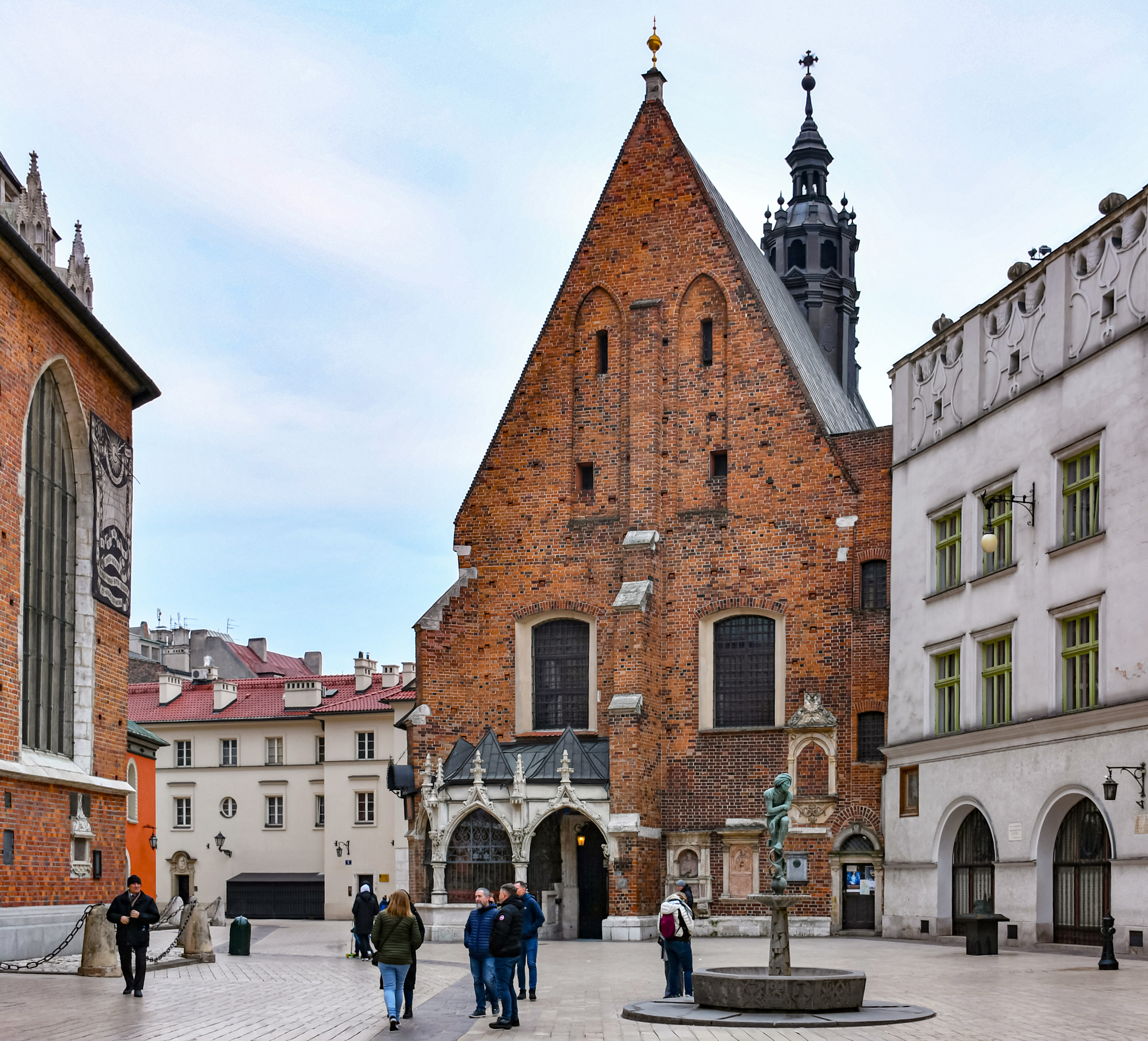
Church of St. Barbara (Jesuit)
9 Little Market Square

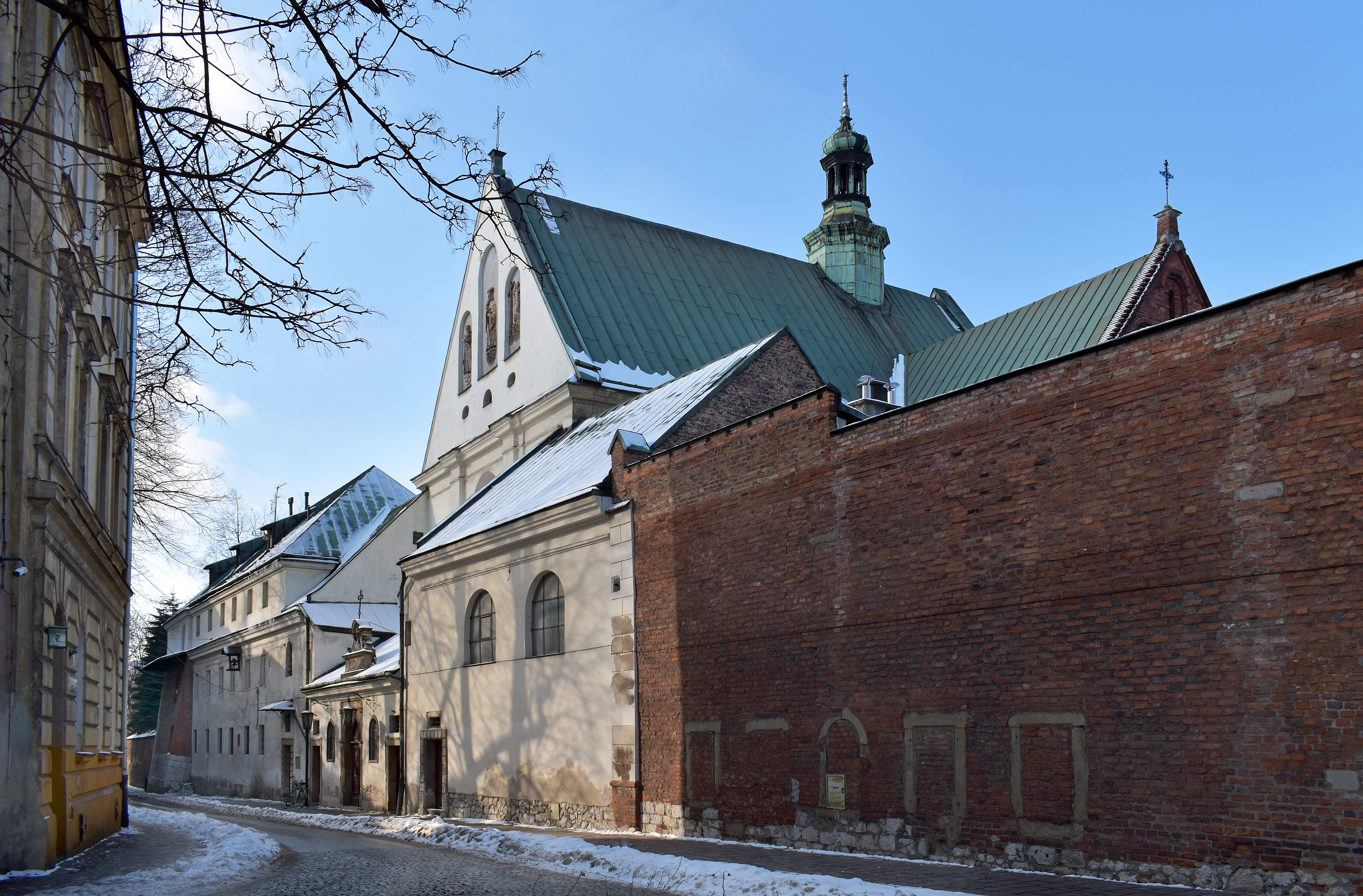
Church of St. Casimir (Franciscan Observants)

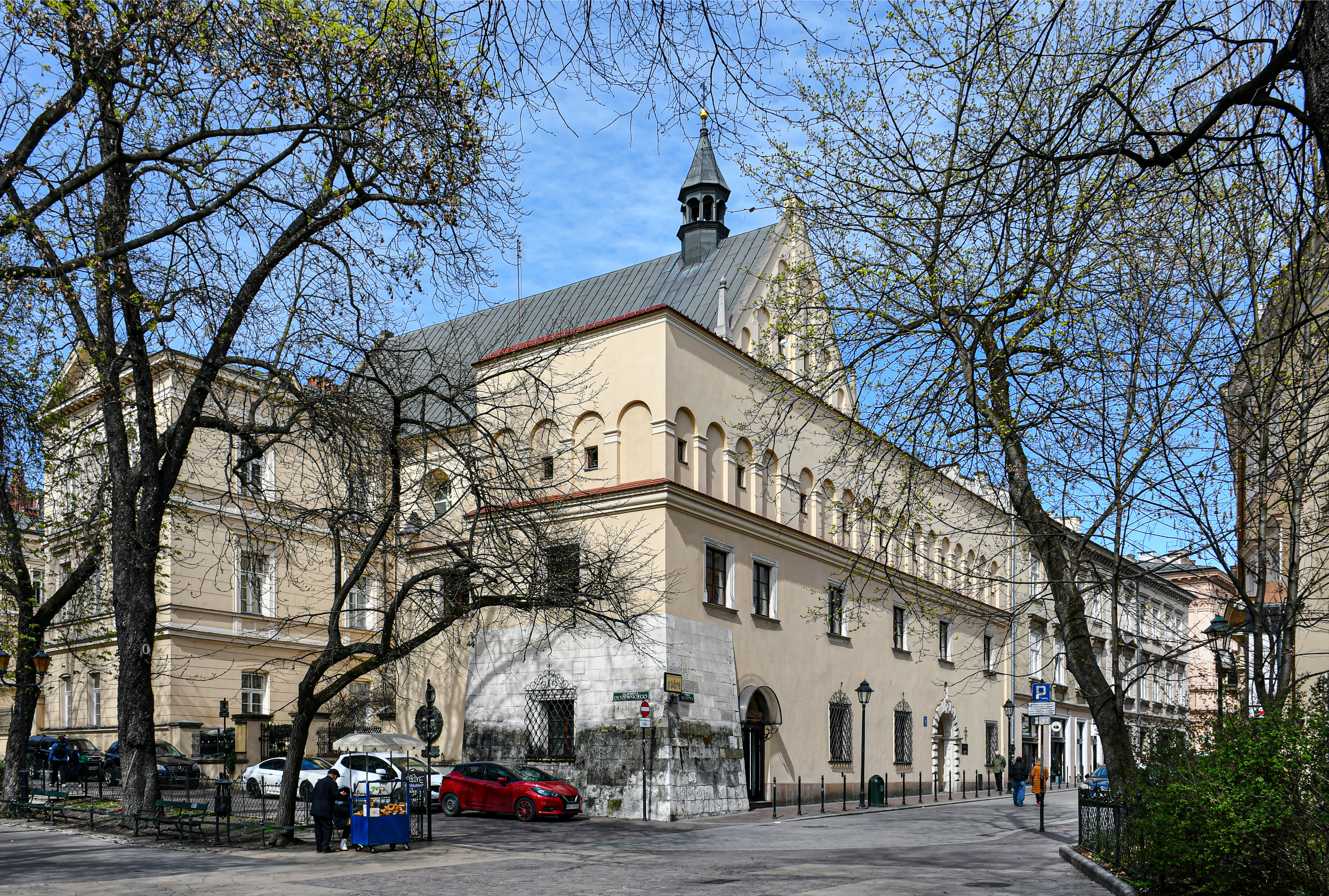
Tserkov of the Exaltation of the Holy Cross (Greek Catholic)
11 Wiślna Street

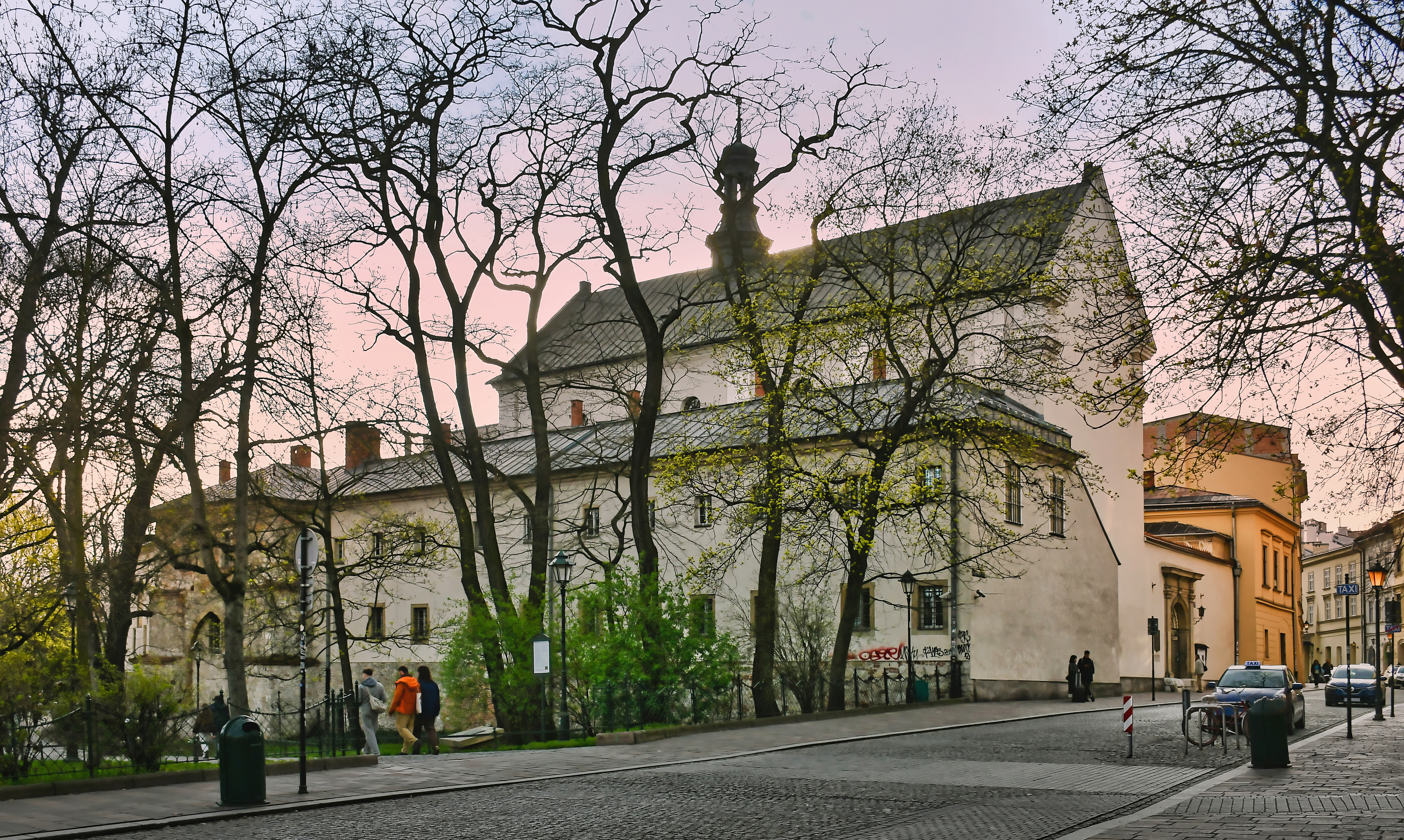
Church of Our Lady of the Snows (Dominican Sisters)
21 Mikołajska Street

=== Sculptures ===
The Old Town district has a profusion of bronze statues and marble monuments. The most pronounced is the Monument of Adam Mickiewicz situated at the Main Marketplace between the St. Mary's Church and the eastern side of Sukiennice. It was unveiled for the centenary of Adam Mickiewicz's birth. The poet is surrounded by four lower groups which symbolize: Homeland i.e. Poland (from the face of the monument), Science – an old man with a boy (from the side of Florianska Street), Poetry (from the side of the Church of St. Wojciech), and Patriotism and Valour (facing Sukiennice). The monument was designed by Teodor Rygier, cast in Rome, and ceremonially unveiled on 16 June 1898. It is a key part of the Market Square panorama and a place of meetings for many young people.

Other well-known monuments include the monument commemorating the poet Józef Bohdan Zaleski at Basztowa Street, showing harpist with a guide boy, made in 1886 by Pius Welonski; the Monument of Jagiello and Jadwiga at Planty Park, made by Tomas Oscar Sosnowski and raised in 1886 in celebration of the quincentenary of the Union between Poland and Lithuania; and the Monument of Lilia Weneda at Planty Park, erected to commemorate poet Juliusz Słowacki showing a character from the poet's drama playing a harp, made by Alfred Daun in 1884. Across from the Palace of Art stands the Monument of Artur Grottger made by Wacław Szymanowski in 1901. Monument of Piotr Skrzynecki is in front of the Vis-á-vis café on the Main Market Square. The monument of Jozef Dietl on the All Saints’ Square was made by Ksawery Dunikowski in 1938 and erected in honour of the first president of Kraków. The monument to Aleksander Fredro is featured in front of the Juliusz Słowacki Theatre, near the Planty Park. It was made by Professor Cyprian Godebski in 1900.

Along Planty – near the Collegium Novum – is the monument to astronomer Nicolaus Copernicus depicting him as an established scholar. It was made by Godebski in 1900. Grażyna Monument at Planty Park presents characters from Adam Mickiewicz's poem entitled "Grażyna" (Grażyna and Litawor). It was made by Alfred Daun in 1884. Monument of Florian Straszewski also at Planty Park is an obelisk erected in honour of co-originator of the Park and made by Edward Stehlik in 1874. The bust of comedy writer Michał Bałucki made by Tadeusz Błotnicki in 1911 is located behind the Juliusz Słowacki Theatre. The Soviet Soldiers’ Graveyard monument situated near the Barbican till 1997 was later moved to Rakowicki Cemetery. Monument to Unknown Soldiers who fell during the Kraków's liberation in 1945 was made by Karol Muszkiet and Marcin Bukowski in 1945. Sculpture entitled "Polonia" near the Church of Franciscans presents the mother, holding a baby in her arms, with a weasel and two dogs. It was made by Genowefa Nowak in 1968. Monument of Tadeusz Boy-Żeleński, a friend of Stanisław Wyspiański, stands near the exit from Poselska Street. It was made by Edward Krzak in 1980. The monument of Cardinal Adam Stefan Sapieha stands in front of the Church of St. Franciscans. It was made from August Zamoyski's 1976 design. New sculpture "Eros Bendato" made by Igor Mitoraj is situated on the Main Market Square, near the Town Hall Tower.

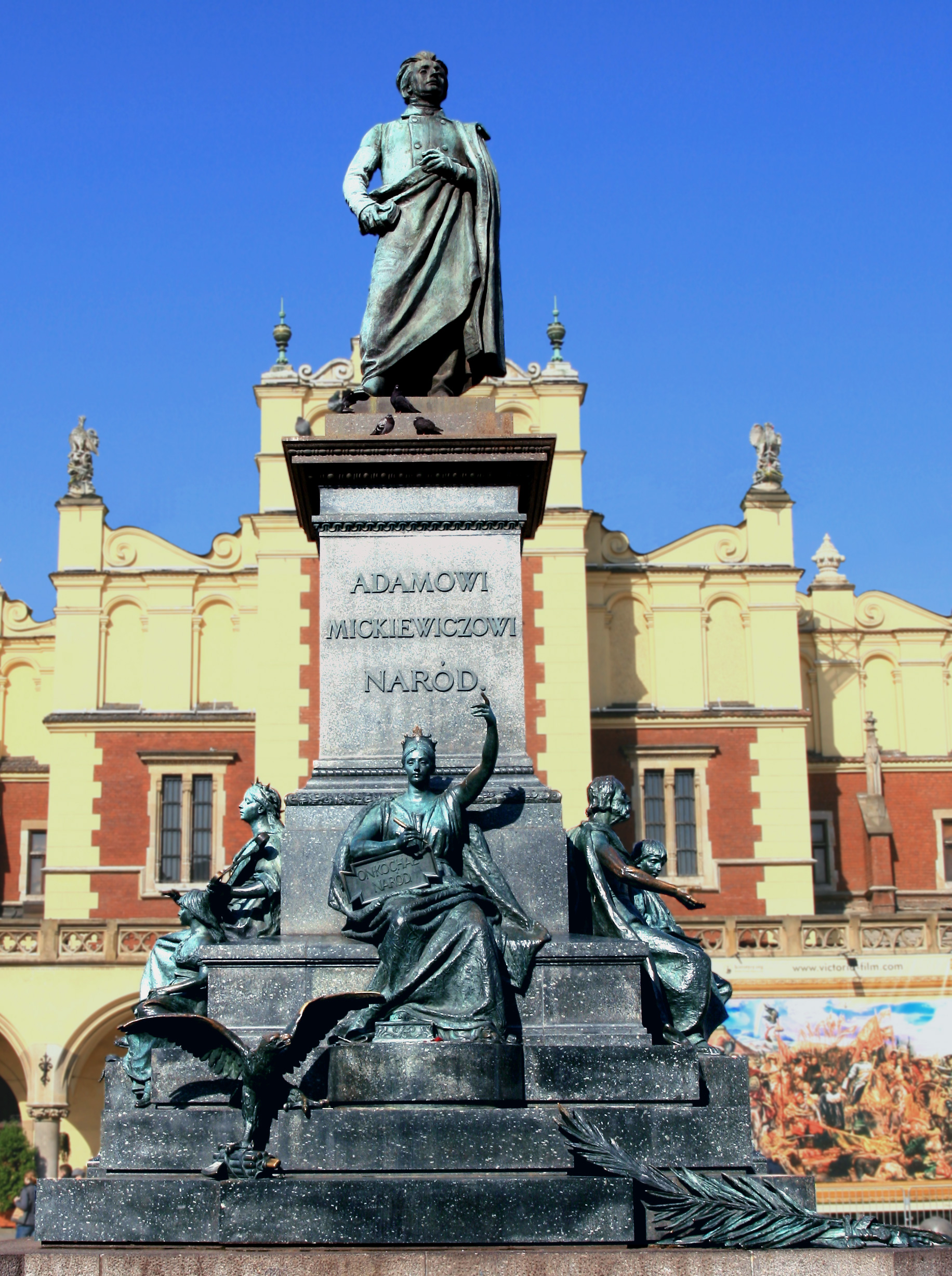
Adam Mickiewicz

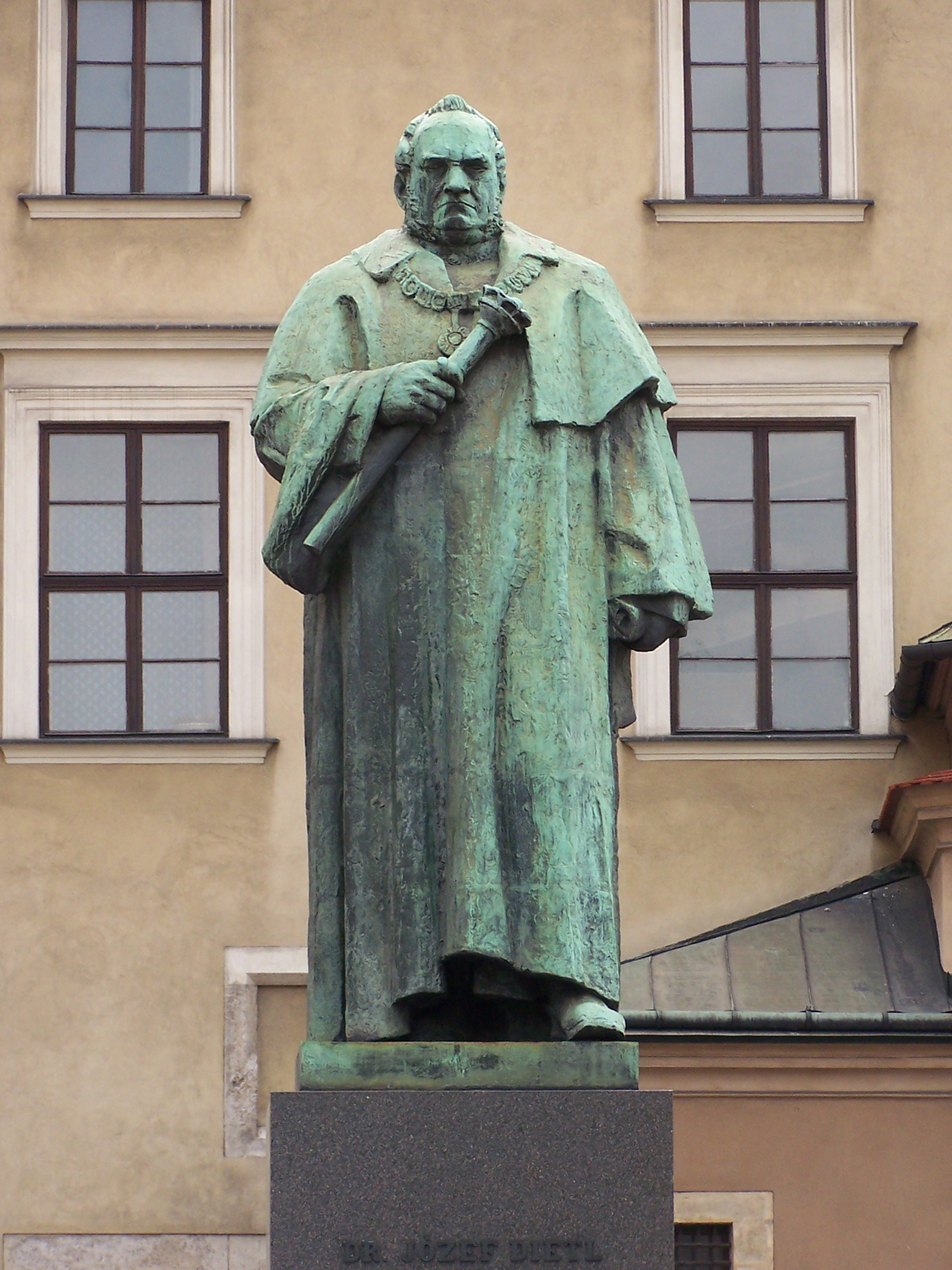
Józef Dietl

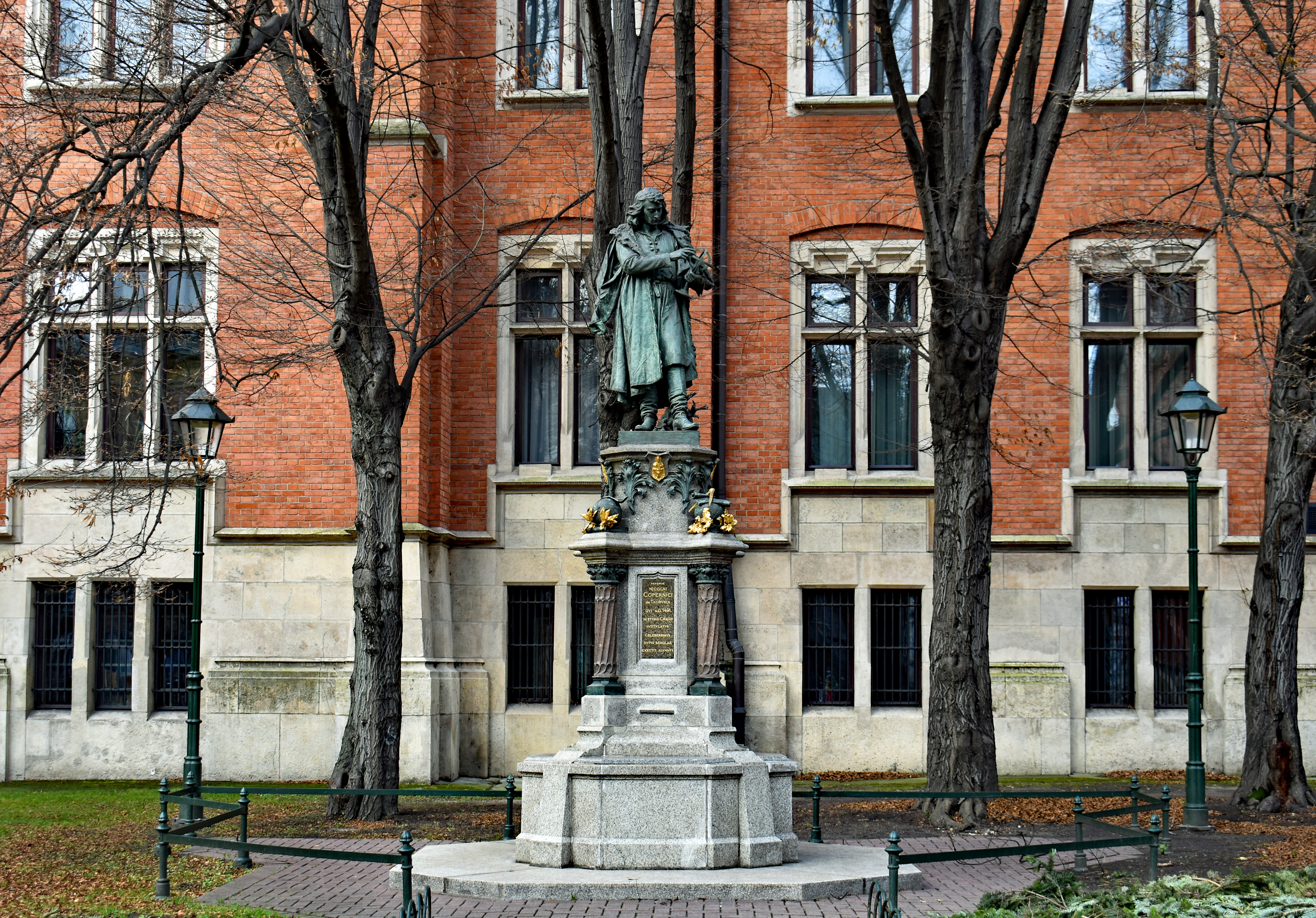
Nicolaus Copernicus

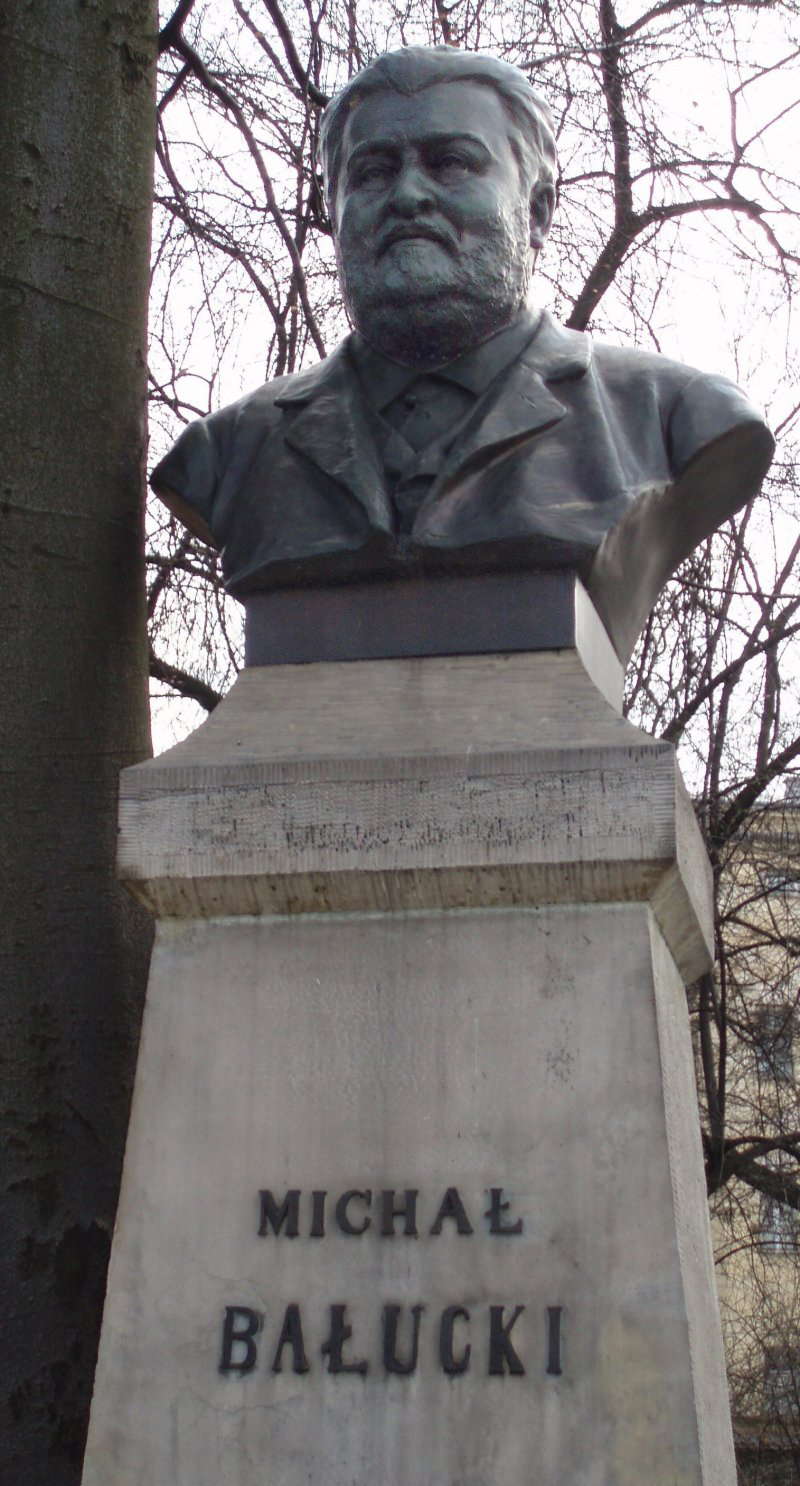
Michał Bałucki

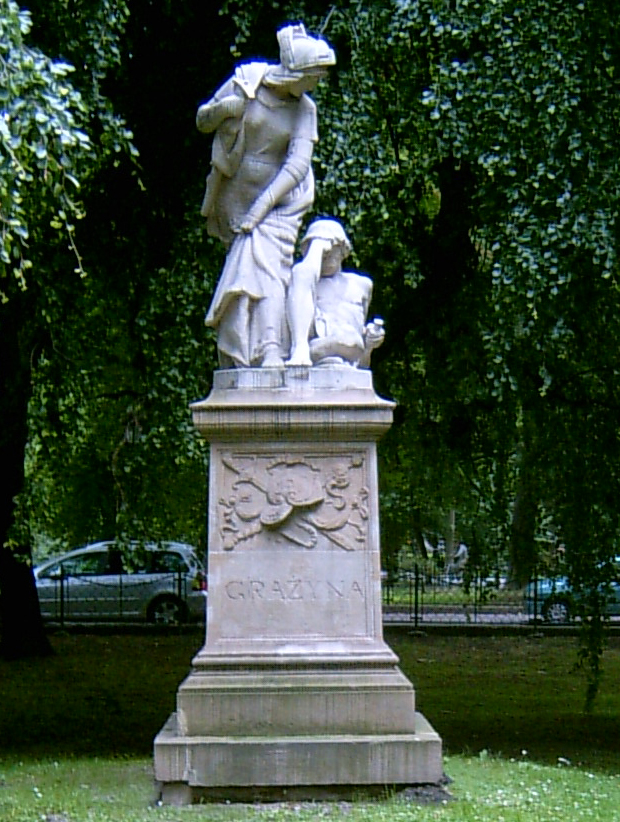
Grażyna

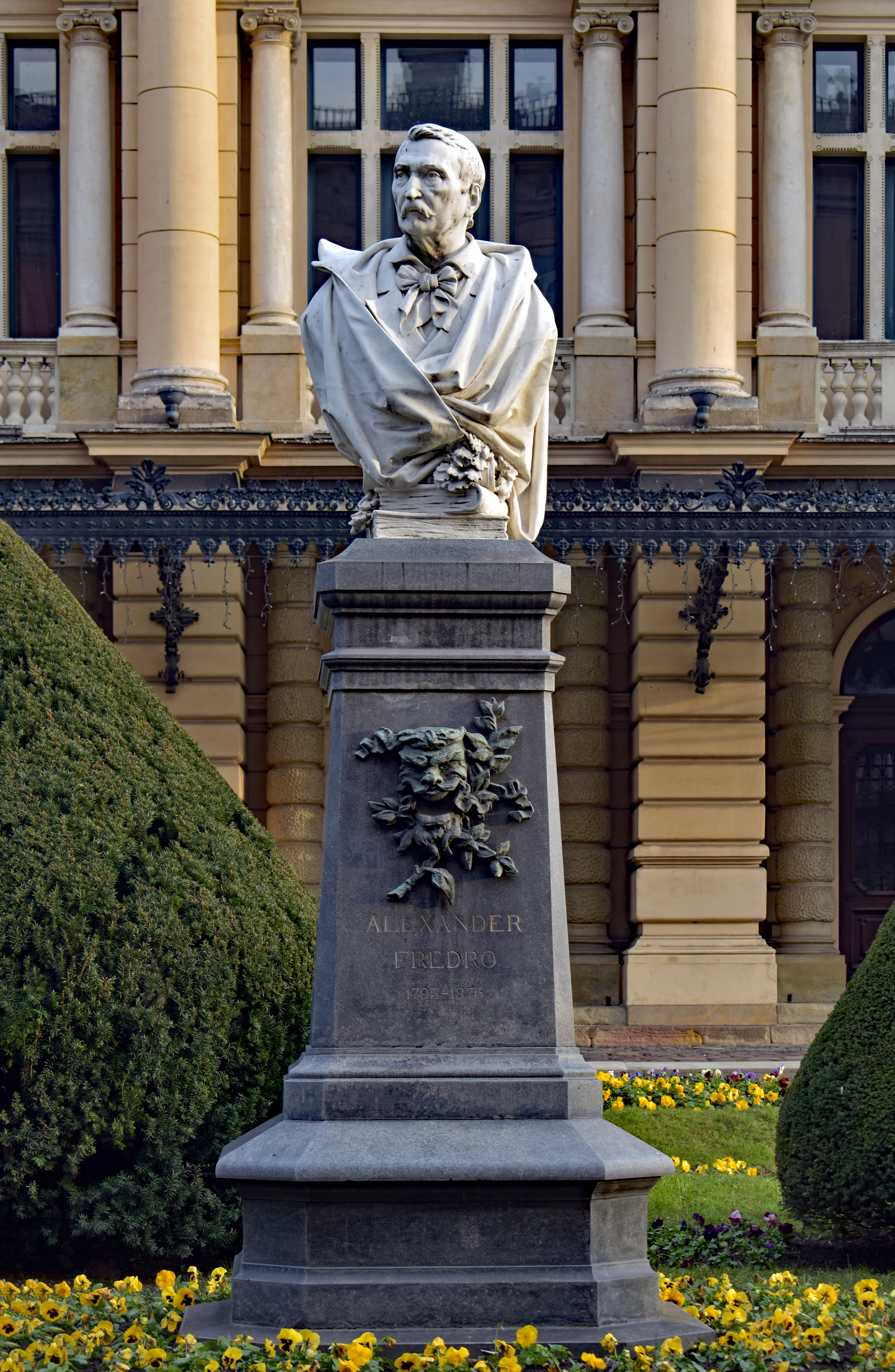
Aleksander Fredro

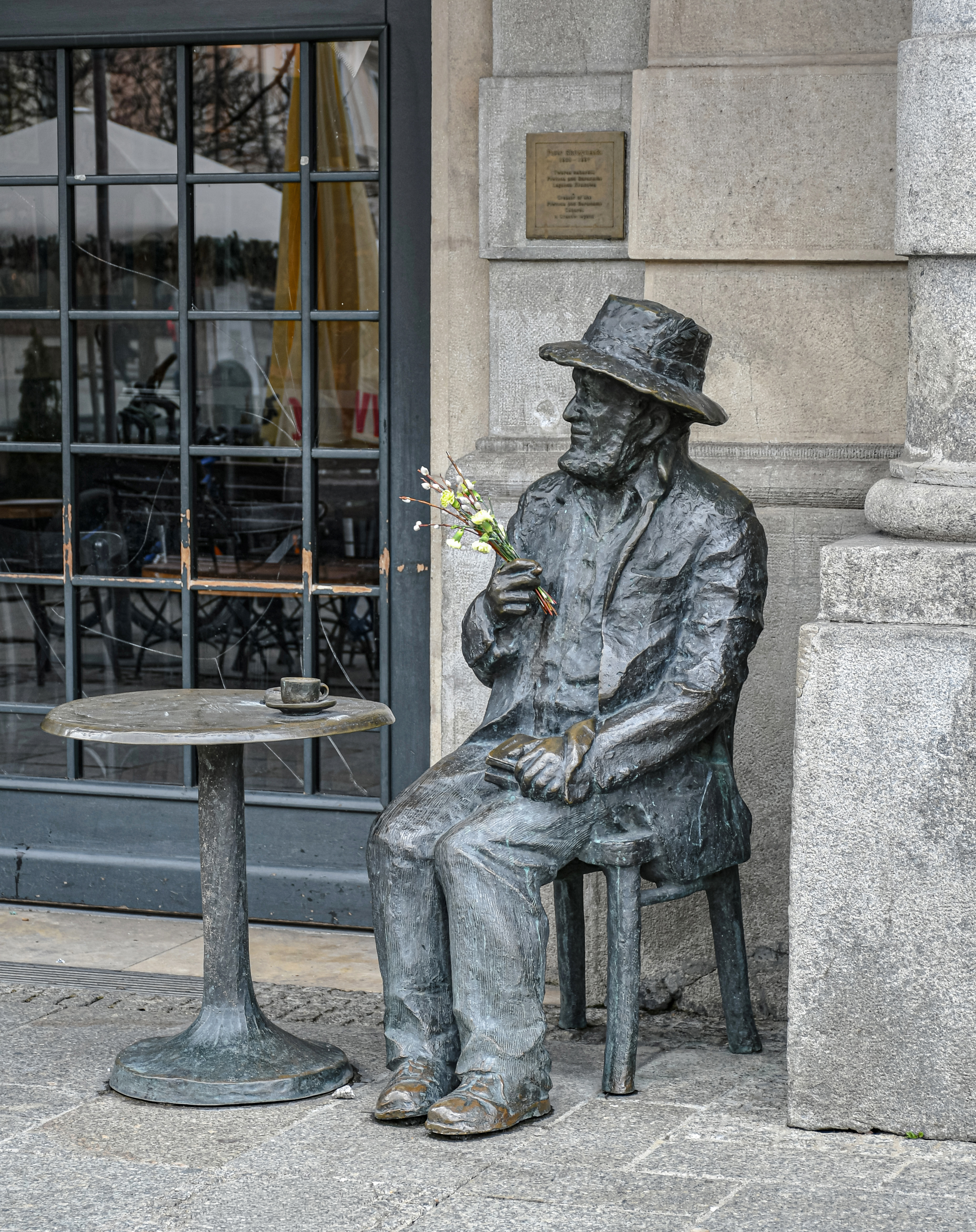
Piotr Skrzynecki

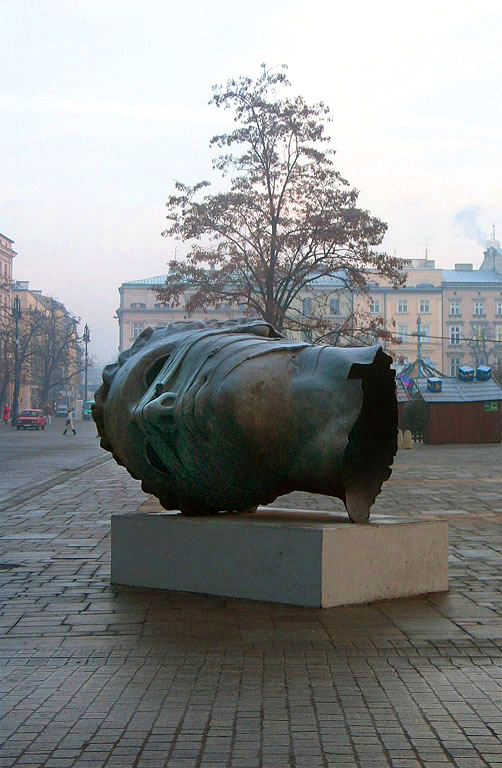
Eros Bendato

=== Gathering places ===
Among the best-known places to visit in and around the Old Town is Wierzynek restaurant at the Main Market Square. Its name refers to townsman Mikołaj Wierzynek and a feast held by him in the 14th century. The artistic café, Jama Michalika, boasts over a hundred years of literary traditions. Here the Zielony Balonik Cabaret has come into being and the Spirit of Young Poland has arisen. At the Main Market Square, there is also the Piwnica pod Baranami cabaret, created by renowned local artists, and a students’ club Pod Jaszczurami. The club is a legend in academic cultural circles. It is a popular place of meetings for the academic environment of Kraków where visitors are always welcome.

Moreover, the Square in the city centre is a place where many famous people and many important events were and are commemorated. There are plaques dedicated to the oath of Tadeusz Kościuszko in 1794, to Prussian Homage in 1525, and to supporting the renovation of Main Market Square from 1964.

== See also ==
- List of World Heritage Sites in Poland
- Culture of Kraków
- Warsaw Old Town
- Wrocław Old Town
