= Church of St. Joseph, Kraków (Old Town) =

Roman Catholic church in Kraków, Poland

Church of St. Joseph
- Kościół św. Józefa
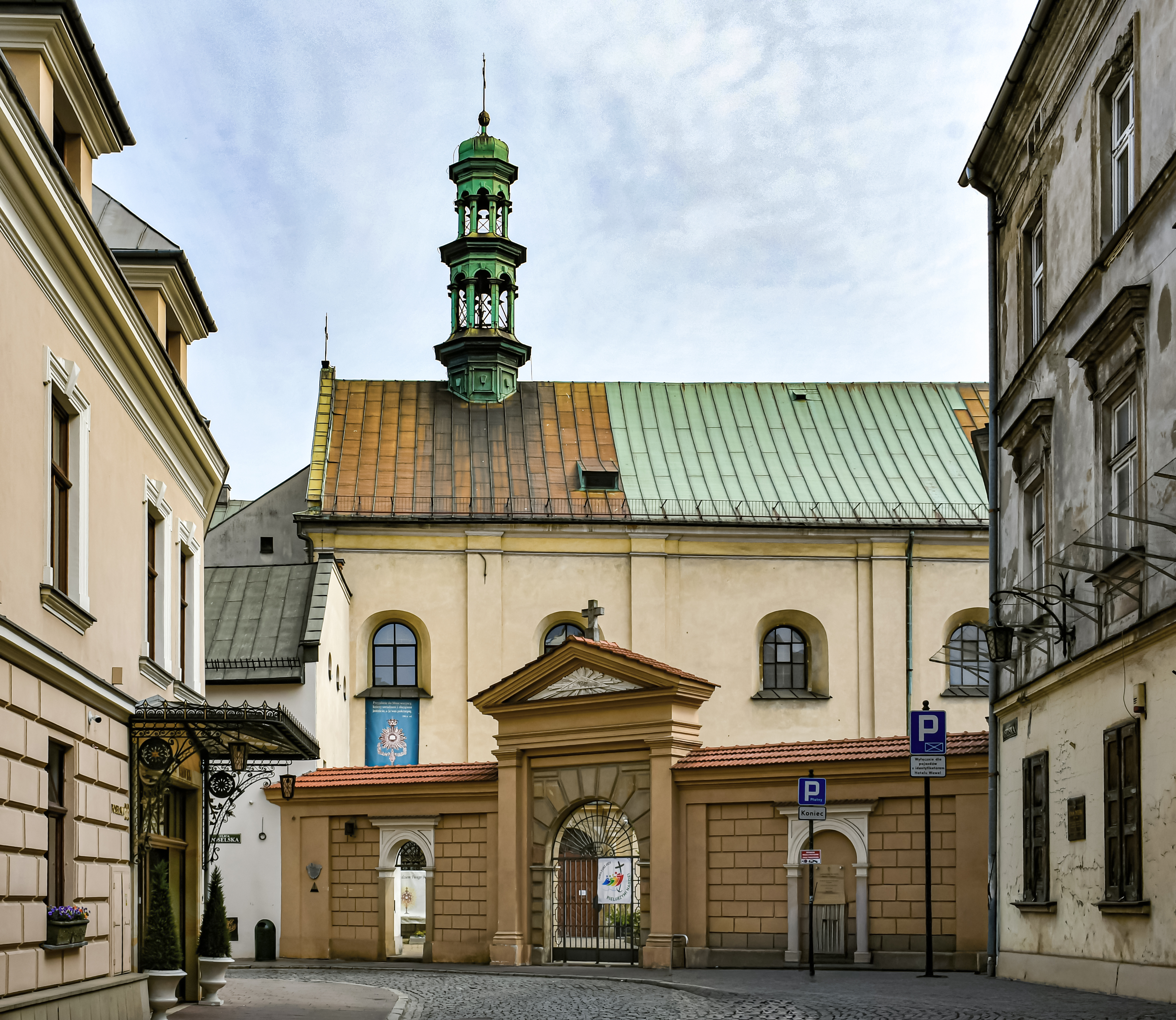
- View from the west
- Church of St. Joseph
- 50°03′29.2″N 19°56′23.3″E
- Location: Kraków
- Address: 21 Poselska Street
- Country: Poland
- Denomination: Roman Catholic
- Website: bernardynki.com/english-information/the-bernardine-sisters/

History
- Consecrated: 1703

UNESCO World Heritage Site
- Type: Cultural
- Criteria: iv
- Designated: 1978
- Part of: Historic Centre of Kraków
- Reference no.: 29
- Region: Europe and North America

Historic Monument of Poland
- Designated: 1994-09-08
- Part of: Kraków historical city complex
- Reference no.: M.P. 1994 nr 50 poz. 418

The Church of St. Joseph (Polish: Kościół św. Józefa), known colloquially as the Bernardine Sisters Church (Polish: Kościół bernardynek) is a historic Roman Catholic conventual church of the Bernardine Sisters (OSFB) located at 21 Poselska Street in Old Town of Kraków, Poland.

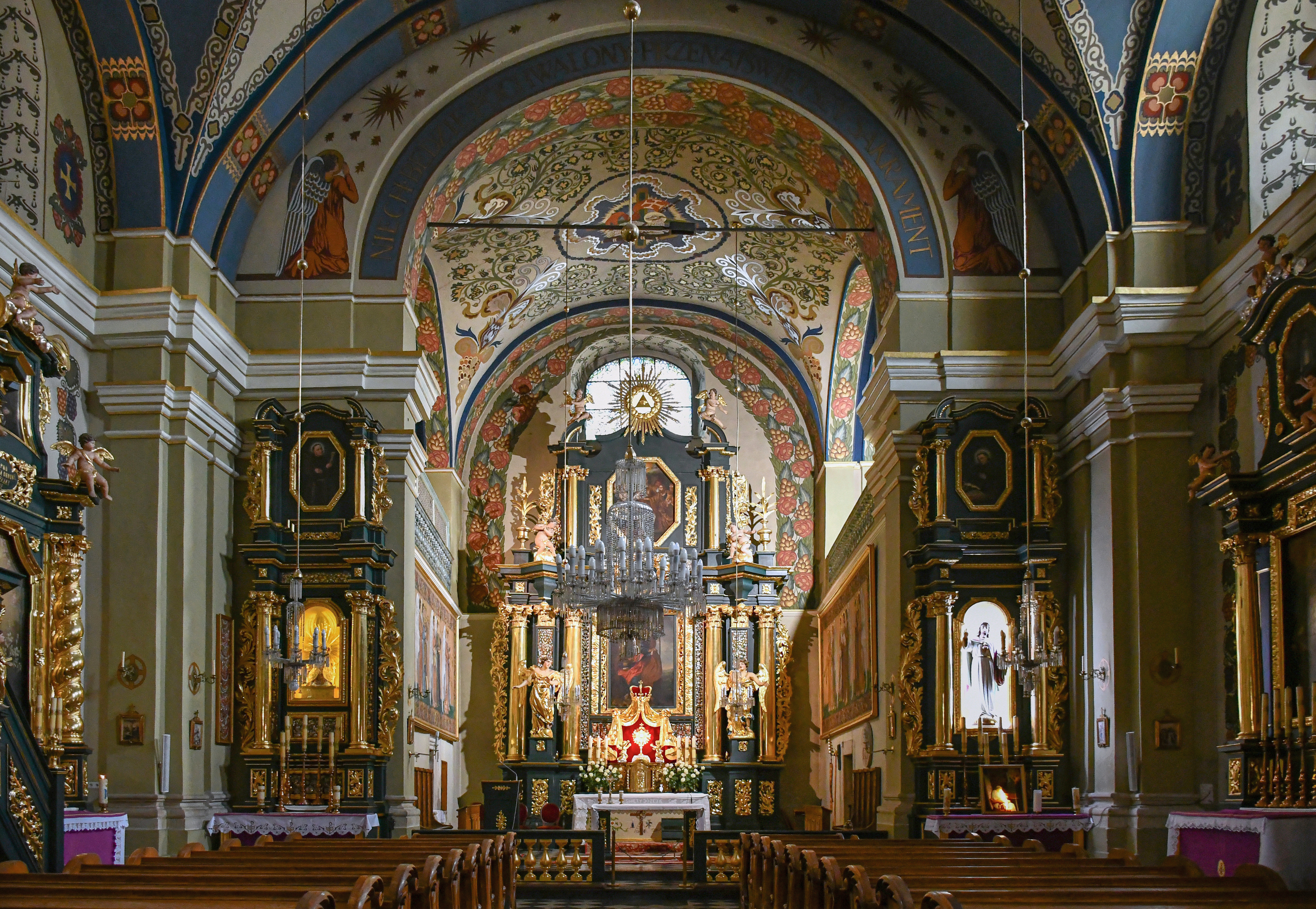
Interior of the church

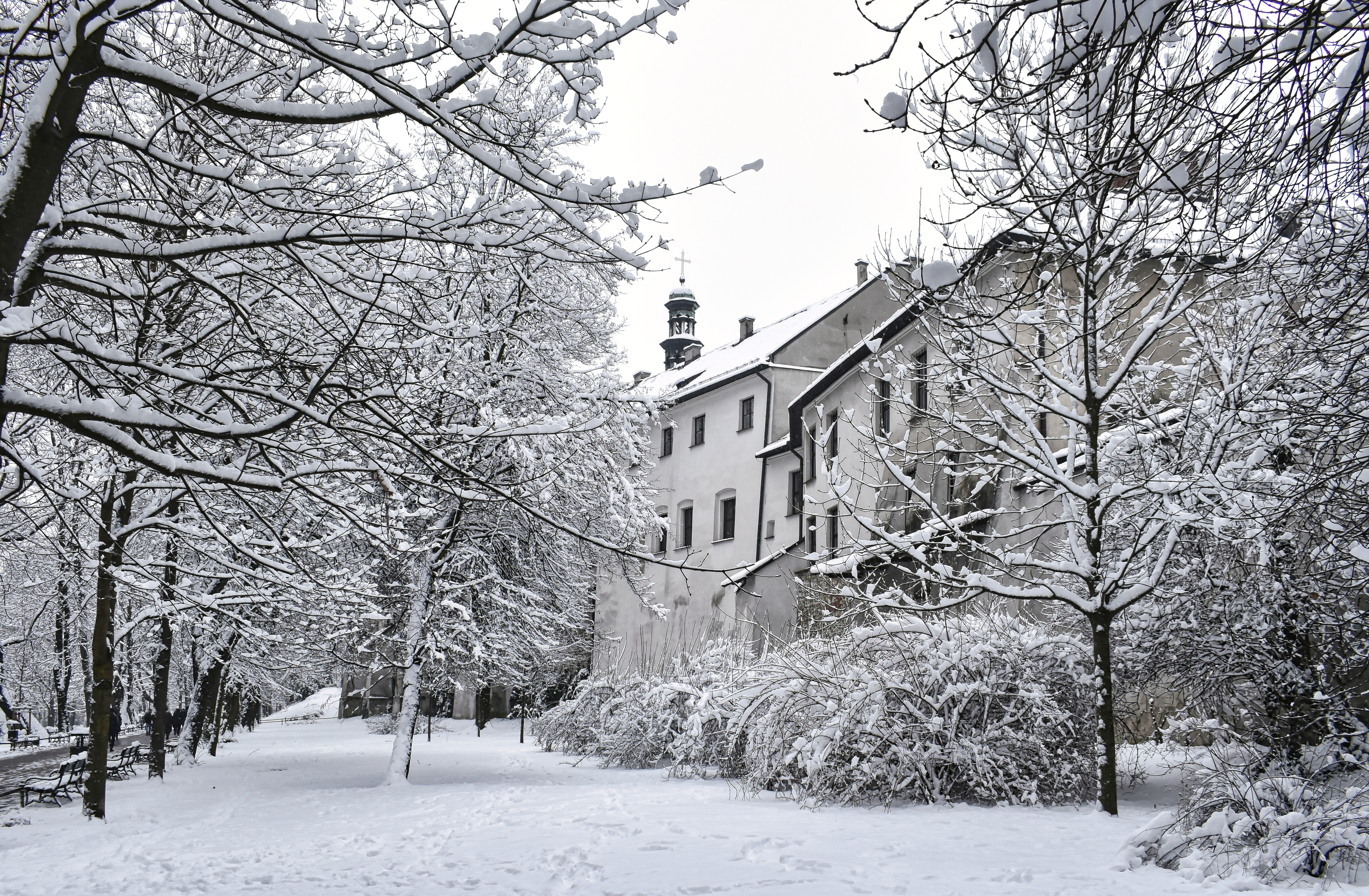
Church and Bernardine Sisters monastery, view from Planty Park

== Bibliography ==
- (in Polish) Michał Rożek, Barbara Gądkowa Leksykon kościołów Krakowa, Wydawnictwo Verso, Kraków 2003, ISBN 83-919281-0-1 pp 62-63 (Lexicon of Kraków churches)
- (in Polish) Praca zbiorowa Encyklopedia Krakowa, wydawca Biblioteka Kraków i Muzeum Krakowa, Kraków 2023, ISBN 978-83-66253-46-9 volume I page 746 (Encyclopedia of Kraków)
