= Royal Route =

Royal Route may refer to:

- Royal Road, Prague, Czech Republic
- Royal Road, Persia
- Royal Road, Gdańsk, Poland
- Royal Road, Kraków, Poland
- Royal Route, Lublin, Poland
- Royal Route, Warsaw, Poland
- Royal-Imperial Route, Poznań, Poland
- Via Regia (Royal Highway): name of several historic European roads
