= Planty Park (Kraków) =

Urban park ring around the Old Town in Kraków, Poland

- Planty
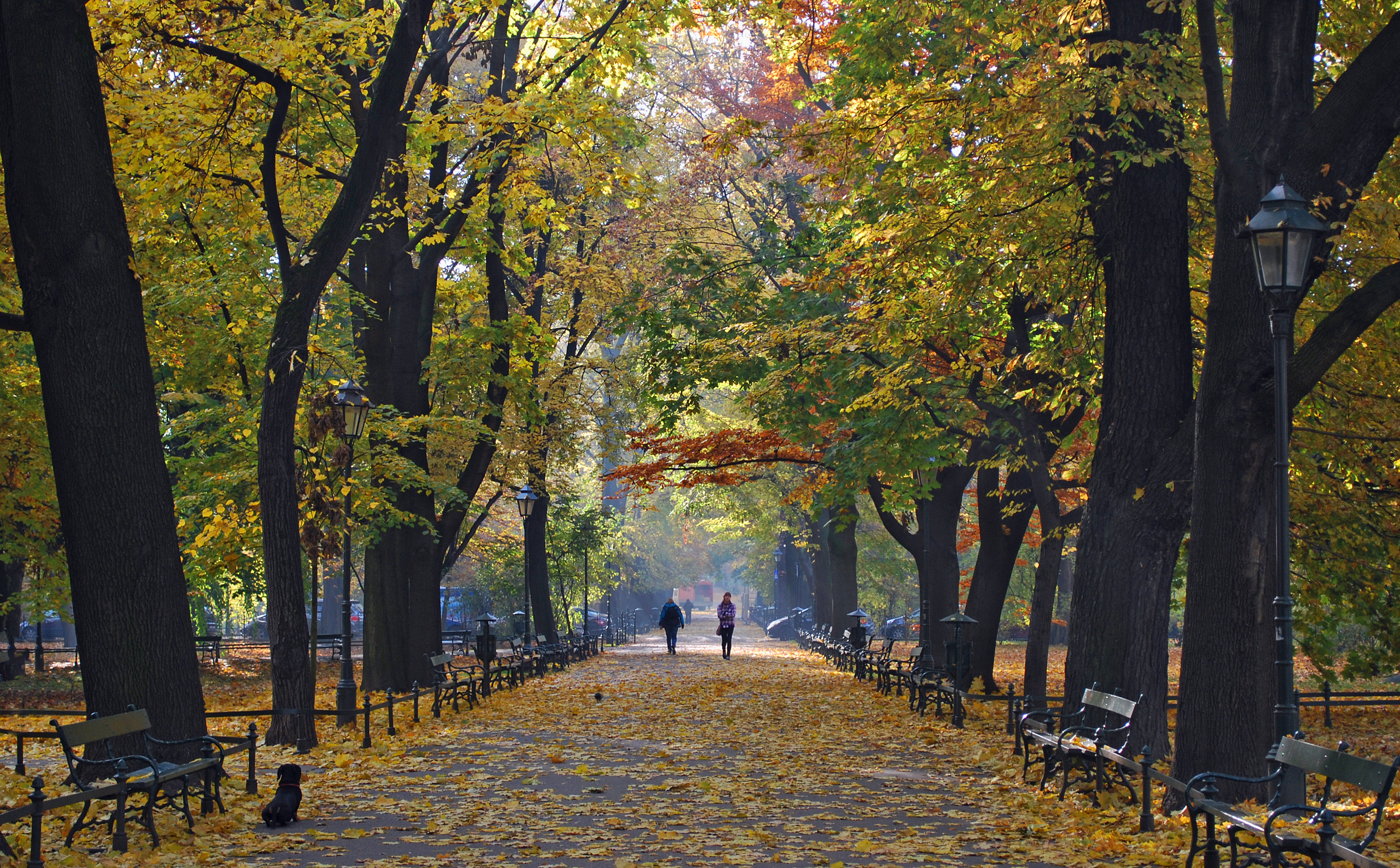
- Walkway with benches under trees in autumn.

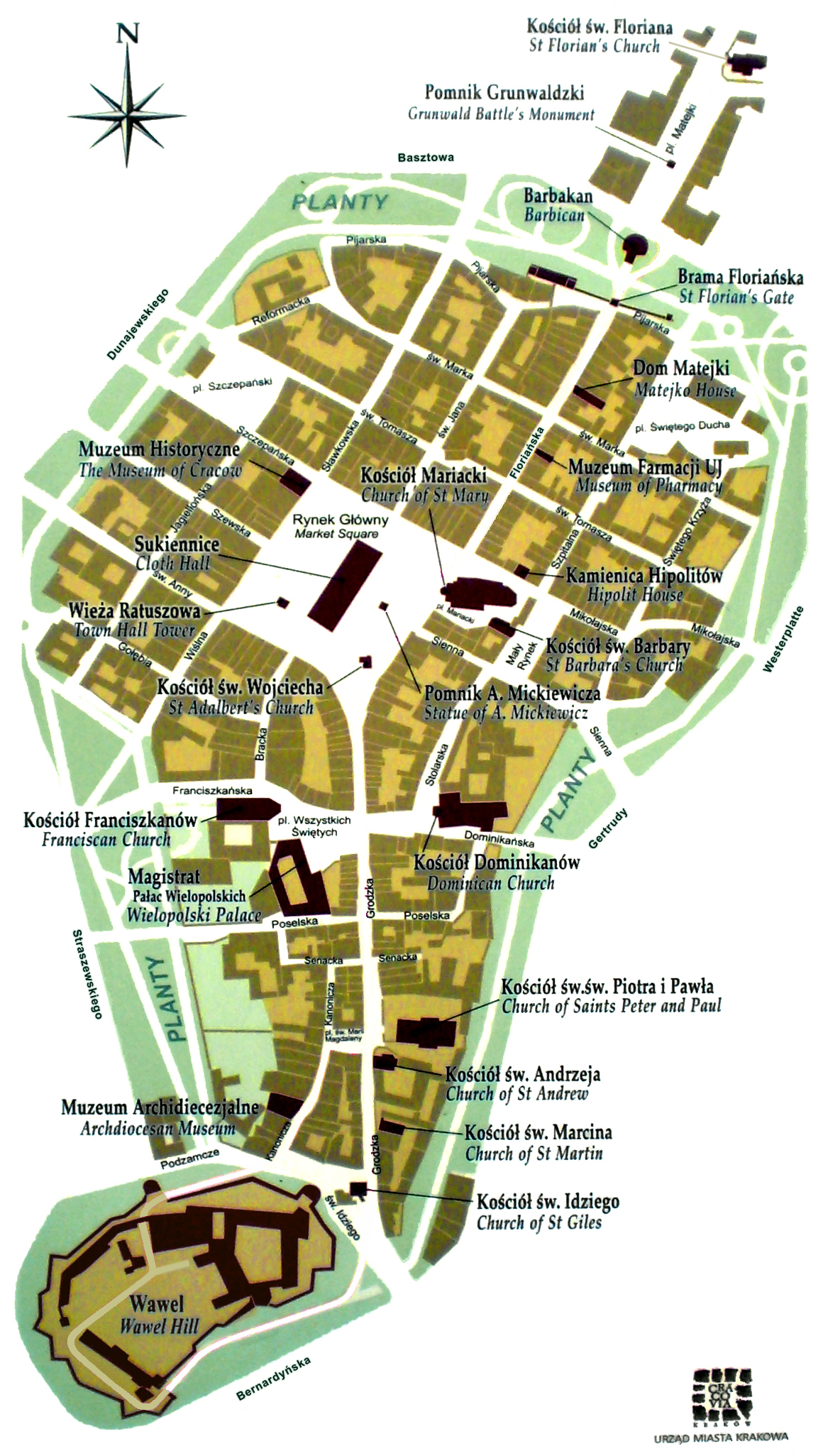
- Planty Park (light green) around Kraków Old Town
- Type: Urban park
- Location: Kraków, Poland
- Coordinates: 50°03′56″N 19°56′24″E
- Area: 21
- Created: 1822
- Designer: Feliks Radwański

UNESCO World Heritage Site
- Type: Cultural
- Criteria: iv
- Designated: 1978
- Part of: Historic Centre of Kraków
- Reference no.: 29
- Region: Europe and North America

Historic Monument of Poland
- Designated: 1994-09-08
- Part of: Kraków historical city complex
- Reference no.: M.P. 1994 nr 50 poz. 418

Planty is a historic urban park surrounding the Old Town in Kraków, Poland. It was built on the site of the destroyed Medieval defensive walls of the city.

The park has an area of 21 ha (52 acres) and a length of 4 km (2.5 mi). It consists of a chain of thirty smaller gardens designed in varied styles and adorned with numerous monuments and fountains. There are over twenty statues of noble historical figures in the park including monuments to Nicolaus Copernicus, Jan Matejko, Queen Jadwiga and King Wladyslaw II Jagiello. There are also several plaques and statues in the park commemorating, among others, Jan Dlugosz, Stanislaw Wyspianski, and the mathematicians Hugo Steinhaus, Stefan Banach and Otto Nikodym.

The park forms a scenic walkway popular with Cracovians.

Most historic sites of old Kraków are located within the park belt along the Royal Road (Polish: Droga Królewska) crossing the park from the medieval suburb of Kleparz – through Florian Gate – at the northern flank of the old city walls. The historic Wawel Castle at the Wawel Hill, adjacent to Vistula River meander, forms the southernmost border of Planty.

== History ==
The green belt was established in place of the medieval walls between 1822 and 1830.

By the beginning of the 19th century the expanding city had begun to outgrow the confines of the old defensive walls. The walls had been falling into disrepair due to lack of maintenance after the Partitions of Poland. As a result, Emperor Franz I of Austro-Hungary ordered the dismantling of the old fortifications. However, in 1817 Professor Feliks Radwański of Jagiellonian University convinced the Senate of the Free City of Cracow to legislate the partial preservation of the old fortifications, namely, the Florian Gate and the adjoining Barbican, one of only three such fortified outposts still surviving in Europe.

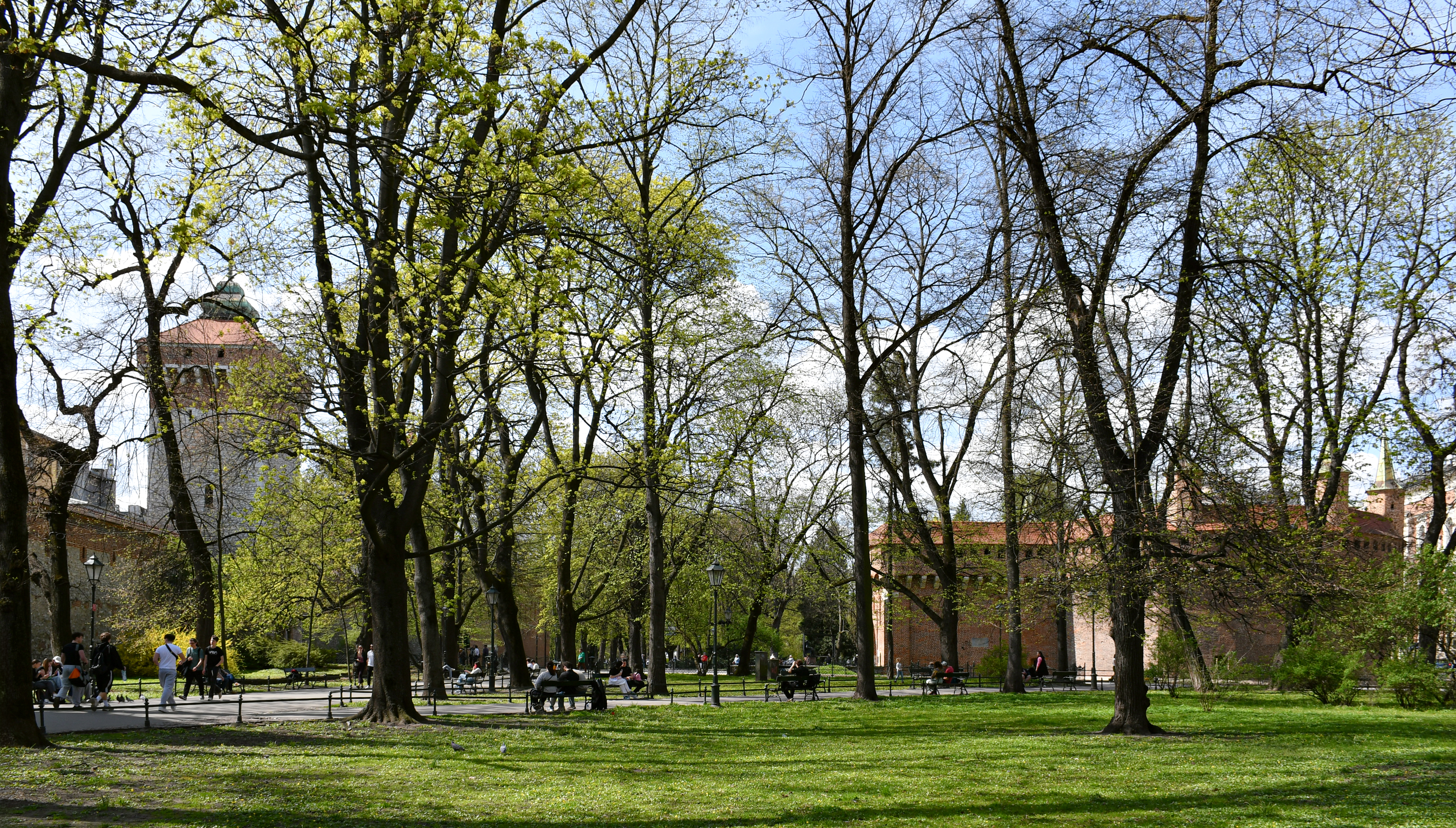
Planty Park. Preserved parts of the city walls: Florian Gate and Barbican

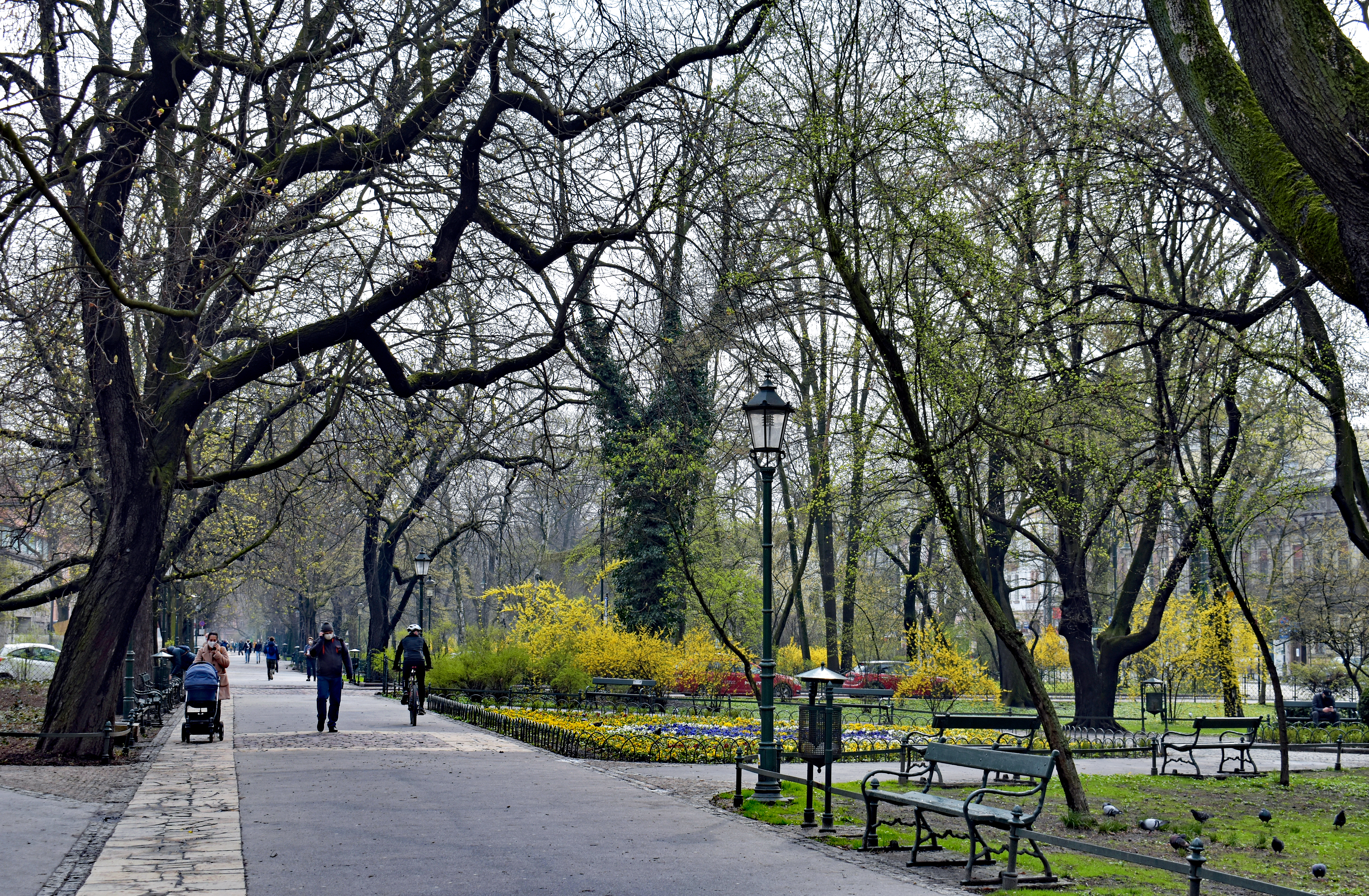
Planty Park. The outline of the former city walls and towers is marked with white stone. Here was the Bookbinders' Tower.

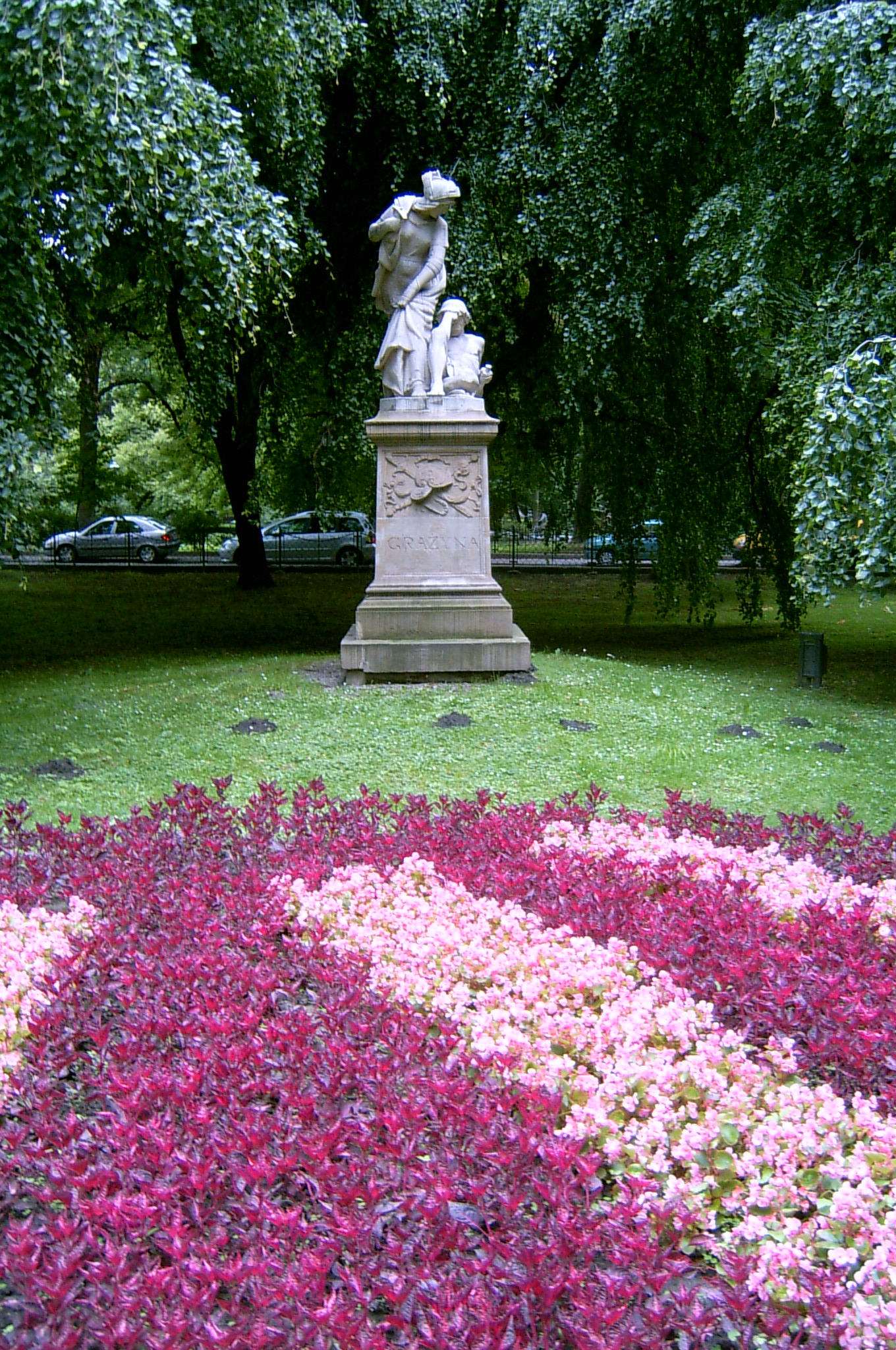
Grażyna Monument

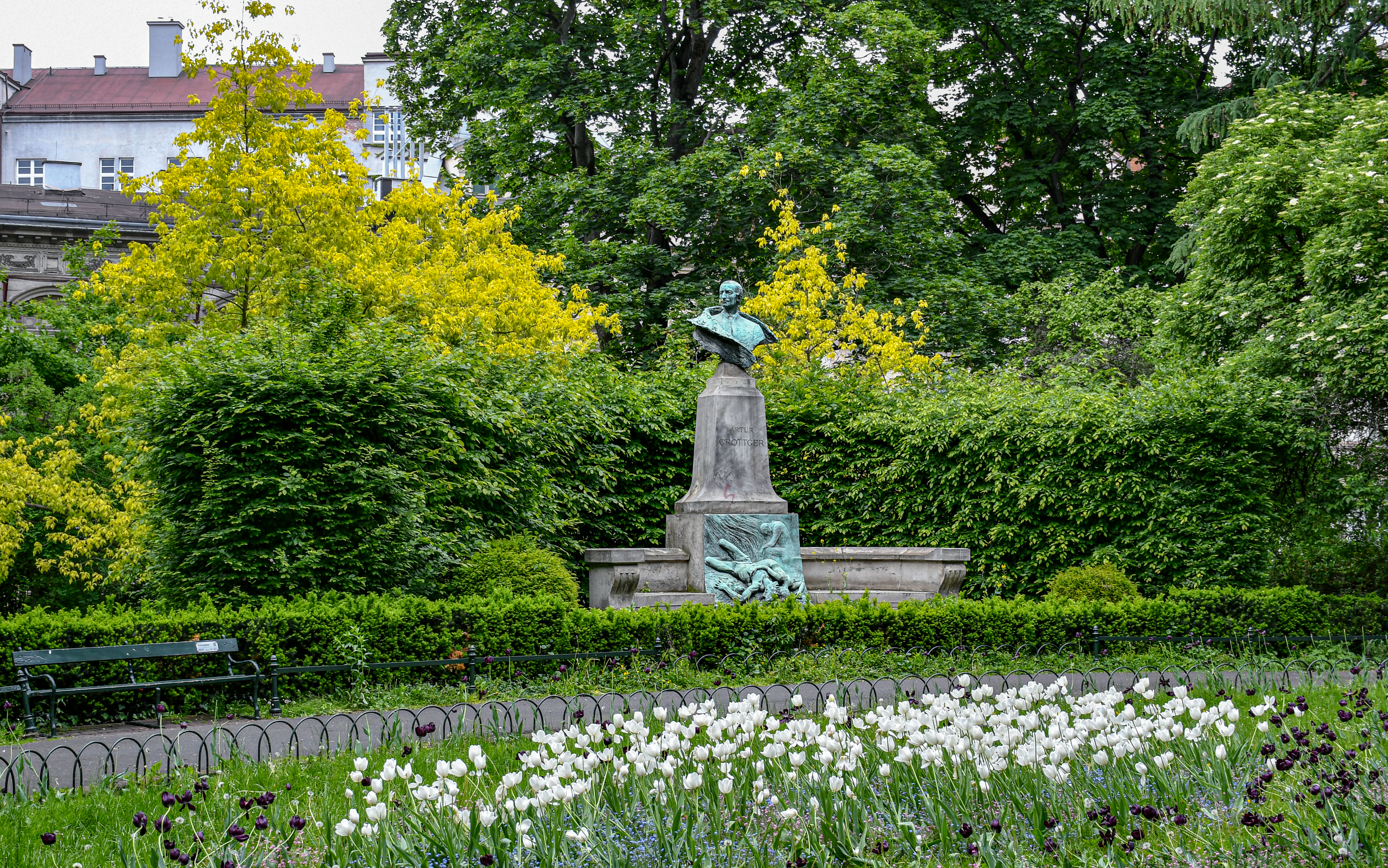
Artur Grottger monument

Orchestra pavilion in the park

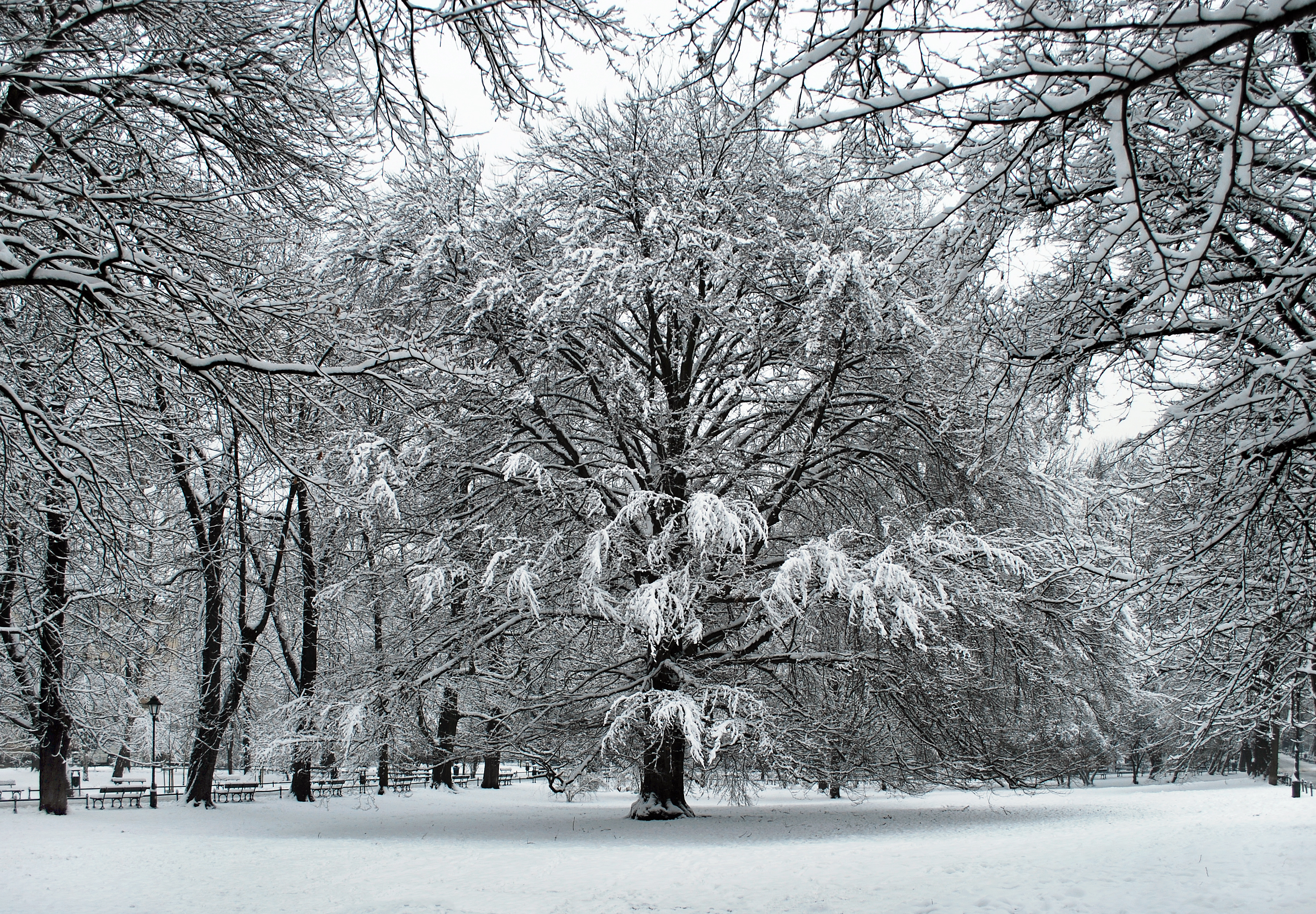
Park in winter

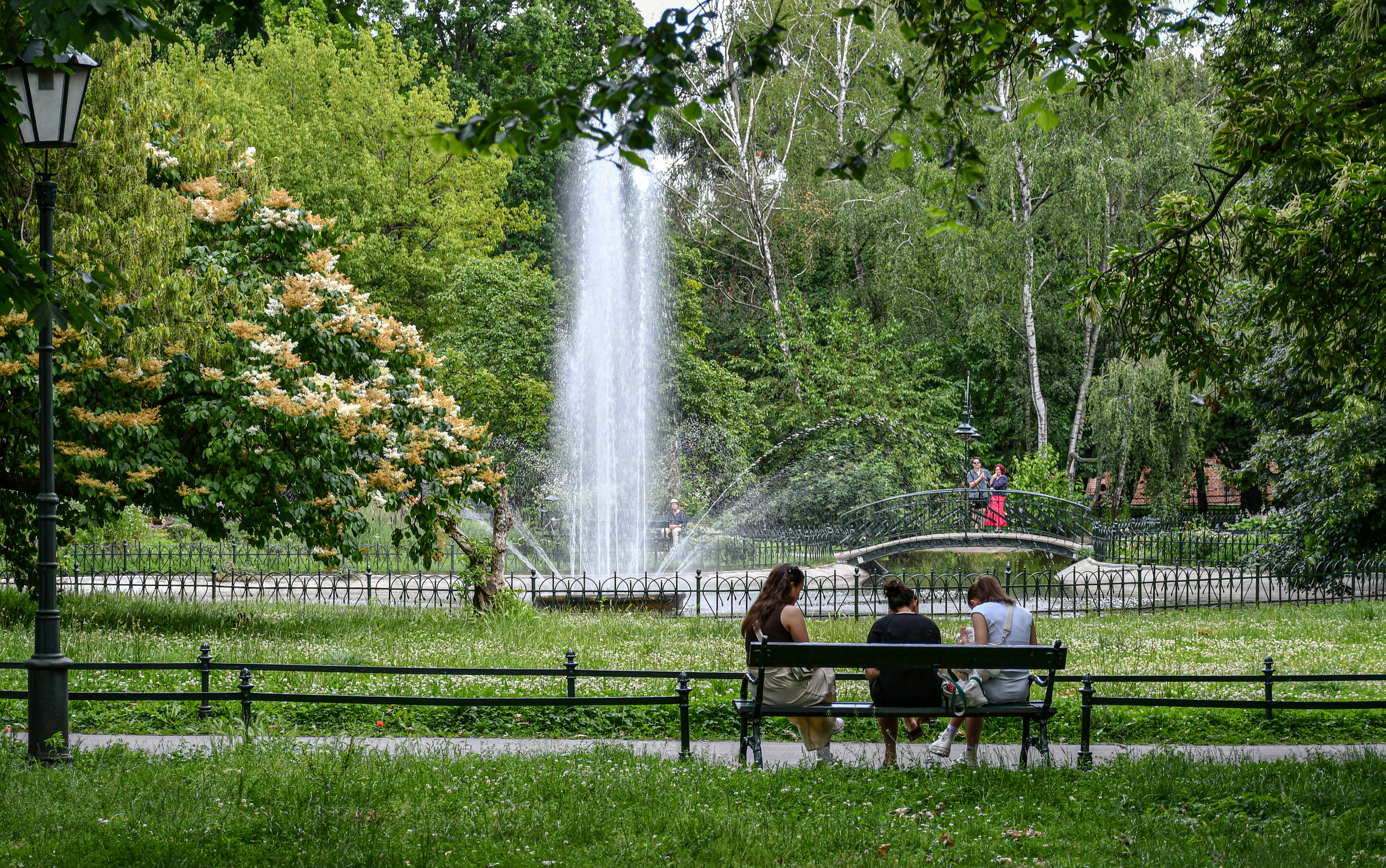
Fountain and pond

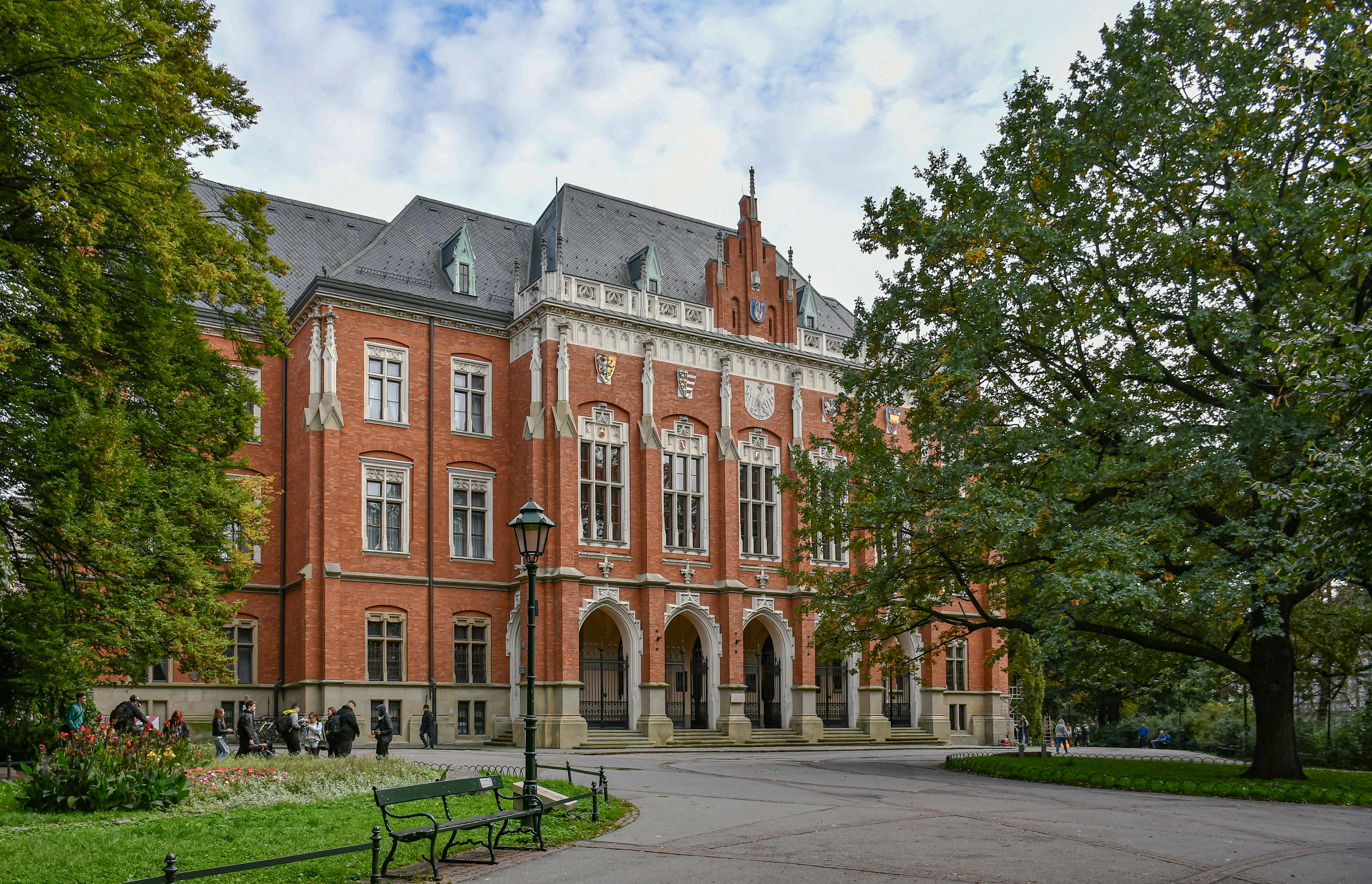
Collegium Novum Jagiellonian University
and Oak of Freedom (right)

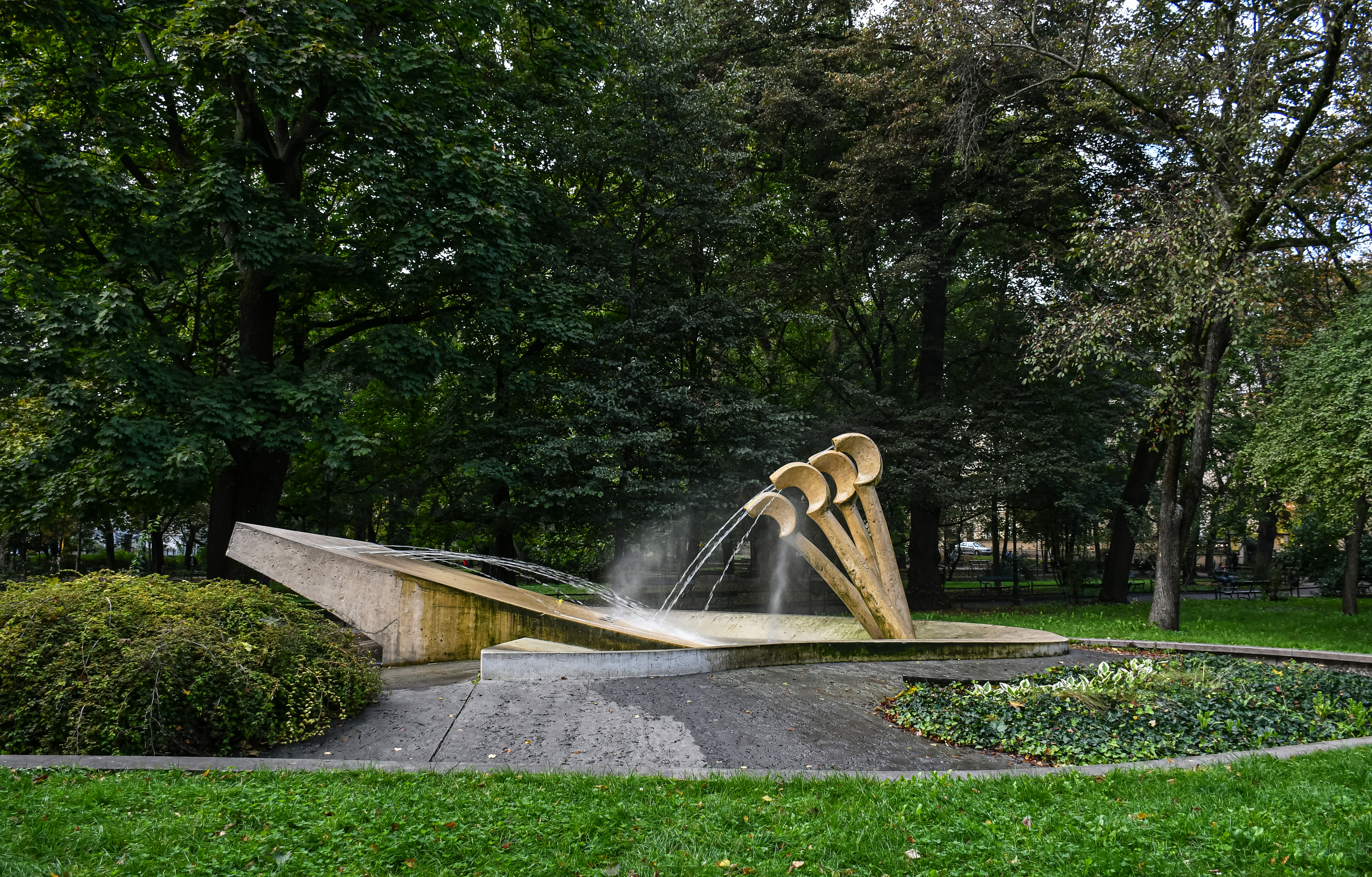
Fountain, monument to Frédéric Chopin

== Bibliography ==
- Praca zbiorowa Encyklopedia Krakowa, wydawca Biblioteka Kraków i Muzeum Krakowa, Kraków 2023, ISBN 978-83-66253-46-9 volume II pp 206–208 (Encyclopedia of Krakow) (in Polish)
