= City walls of Kraków =

Remains of Kraków city defensive walls
- Pozostałości murów obronnych miasta Krakowa
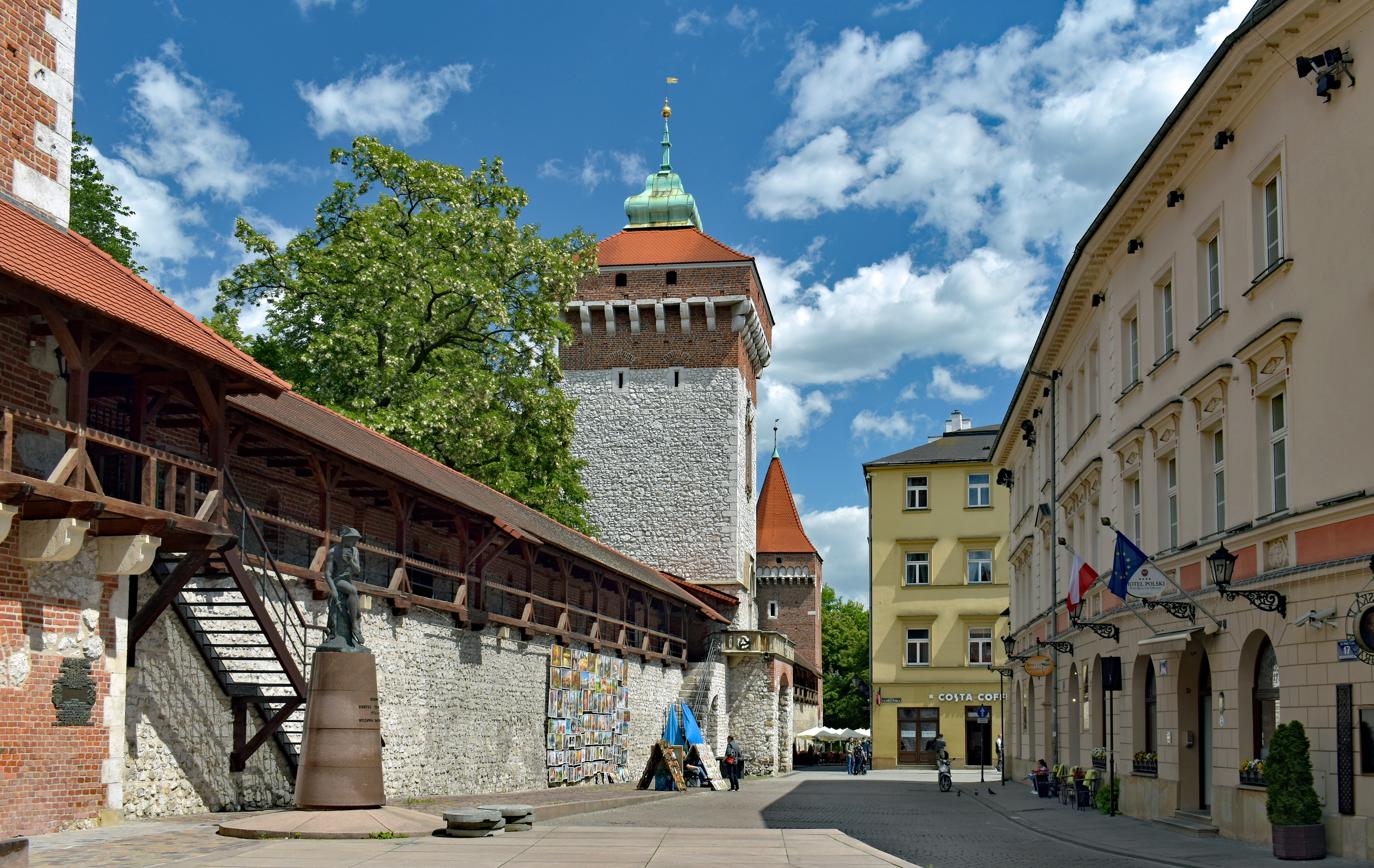
- The wall along Pijarska Street with St. Florian's Gate and, in the background, the Haberdashers' Tower.

General information
- Location: Kraków; Poland, Pijarska Street
- Coordinates: 50°03′53.7″N 19°56′28.1″E

UNESCO World Heritage Site
- Type: Cultural
- Criteria: iv
- Designated: 1978
- Part of: Historic Centre of Kraków
- Reference no.: 29
- Region: Europe and North America

Historic Monument of Poland
- Designated: 1994-09-08
- Part of: Kraków historical city complex
- Reference no.: M.P. 1994 nr 50 poz. 418

The city walls of Kraków (Polish: Mury miejskie w Krakowie) were a complex of city walls and defensive structures (including gates and towers) that once surrounded the entire Kraków area (today’s Old Town). A small section of the medieval fortifications survives along Pijarska Street.

== History ==
=== Construction ===
Until the 13th century, Kraków did not have masonry city walls. The Okół, located at the foot of Wawel Hill, was most likely surrounded by an earthen rampart and a palisade. In 1241 the city was completely destroyed during the first Mongol invasion of Poland. In 1257 the new city was located, probably surrounded by wooden and earthen fortifications. Nevertheless, it was not until 1285 that Duke Leszek II the Black granted the city right to build city walls, as gratitude for their loyalty in his conflict with Konrad I of Masovia. The construction process lasted over a dozen years and was completed during the reign of King Wenceslaus II, between 1300 and 1305. The second stage involved completing and connecting the city walls with those of Wawel Castle and the Okół into a unified defensive system, which was finished during the reign of Casimir III the Great.

Casimir the Great also built city walls around Kazimierz, which at that time was a separate town. The walls of Kazimierz had five gates: the Wieliczka Gate, the Skawina Gate, the Clay Gate, the Kraków Gate, and the Bochnia Gate.

Around 1404, during the reign of Władysław Jagiełło, construction of a second, outer line of walls began. The outer wall surrounded the entire city, except for the southwestern section, which was protected by marshy terrain (this gap was filled in the 16th century). The culmination of this phase of fortification works was the completion of the Barbican in front of the St. Florian's Gate in 1498.

By 1473, the Kraków walls had seven gates and seventeen towers. At the same time, work began on modernizing the fortifications to adapt them to warfare involving firearms and artillery. The towers built in this period, eventually numbering forty-seven, had a different architectural form; they were lower and based on a semicircular plan.

In 1533, a royal arsenal was built next to the Grodzka Gate, and in 1565 a municipal arsenal was constructed between the Carpenters’ Tower and the Joiners’ Tower.

The wall was approximately 3,400 meters long, 2.2 to 2.7 meters thick, and 9.5 meters high. It was surrounded by an outer wall and a moat. Until the mid-17th century, Kraków’s fortifications were considered strong and well-maintained. Their deterioration occurred later, as they were gradually built over by other structures and left without repairs. The city repelled its last assault in 1768, when the Russians attacked the St. Florian Gate.

=== Demolition ===
From the 17th century onwards, the state of the fortifications gradually deteriorated. During the Swedish invasion of Poland the neglect became evident. Between 1810 and 1814, on the orders of Emperor Francis I of Austria, the moat was filled in and the walls with their towers dismantled. Professor Feliks Radwański defended the remaining section, arguing humorously in the Senate of the Free City of Kraków that the walls “protected St. Mary’s Church from foul Kleparz winds that would carry stench and rubbish, and indecently lift the skirts of our good ladies.”

On 13 January 1817, the Senate decided to preserve for posterity a fragment of the medieval fortifications near St. Florian’s Gate together with the Barbican and three towers: the Carpenters’, Joiners’, and Haberdashers’.

In place of the fortifications, a city park was established, Planty.

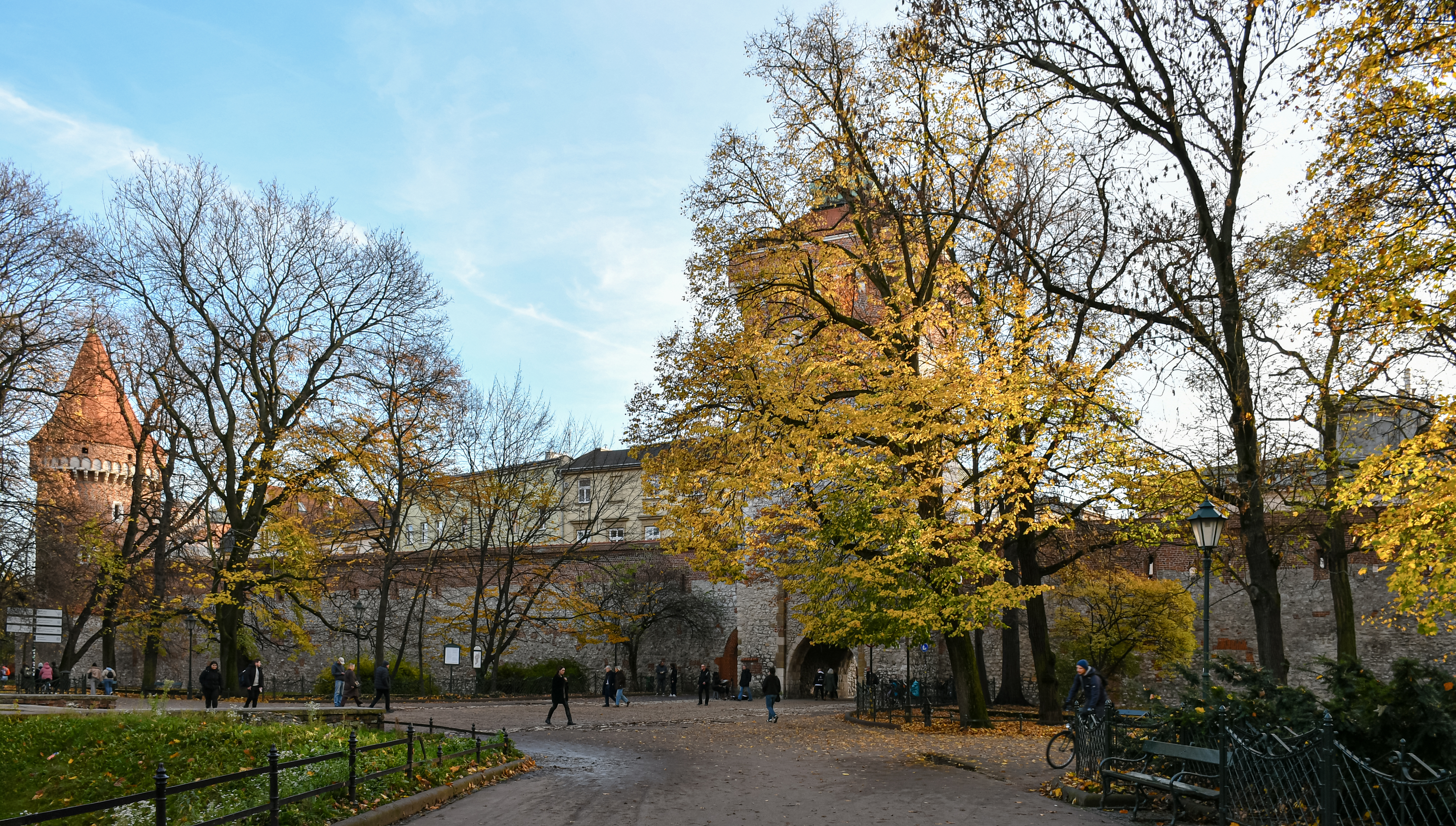
Preserved part of the city walls view from Planty Park. The Girdlers' Tower on left and St. Florian's Gate.

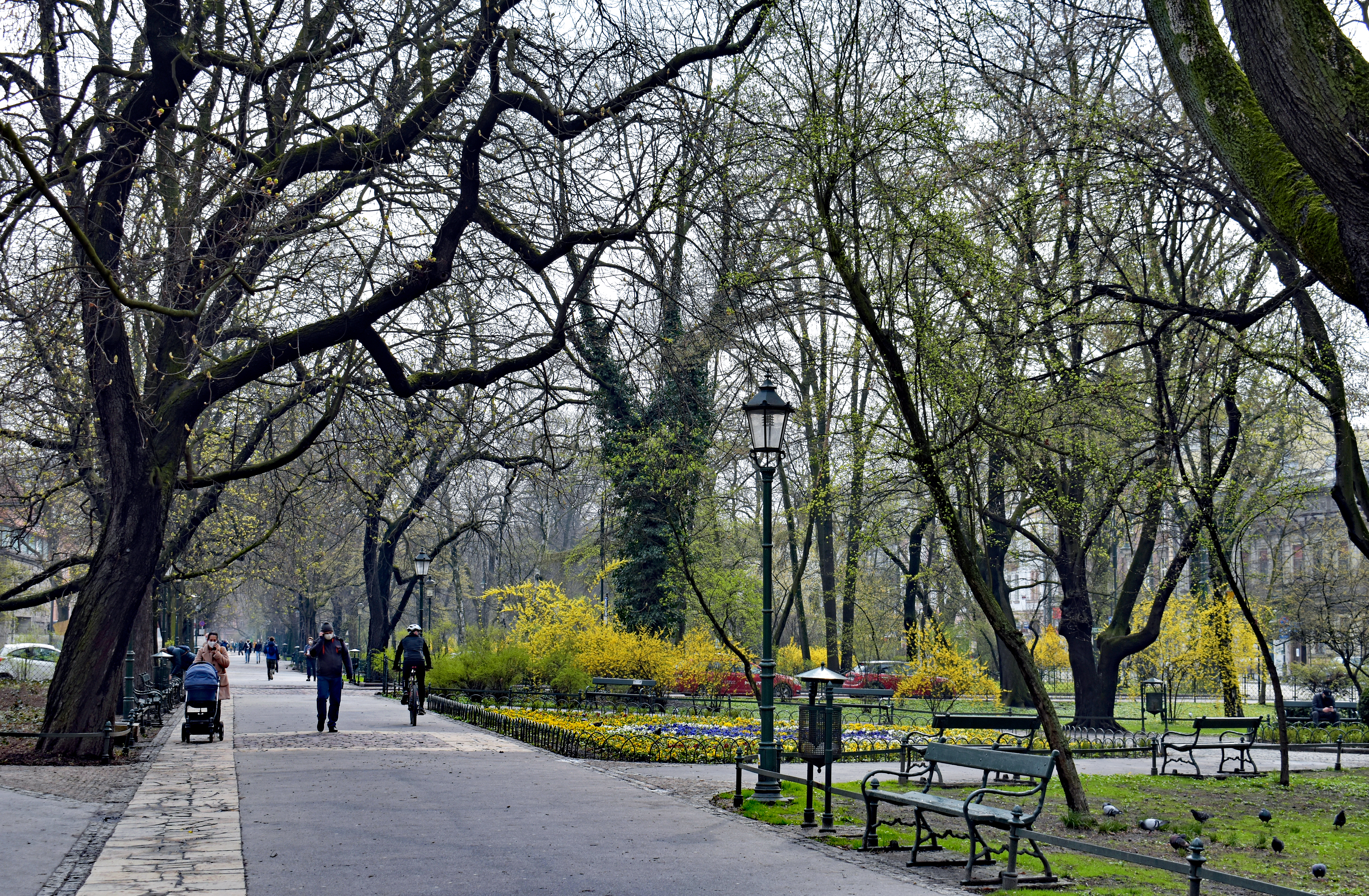
Planty Park. The outline of the former city walls and towers is marked with white stone. Here was the Bookbinders' Tower.

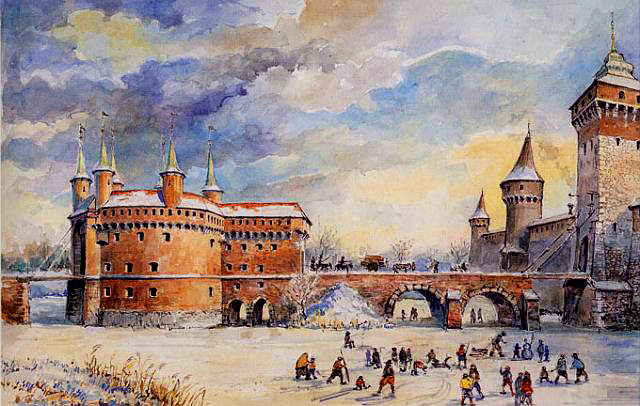
18th–19th-century engraving depicting the Barbican, St. Florian's Gate, and towers: Haberdashers' and Innkeepers’

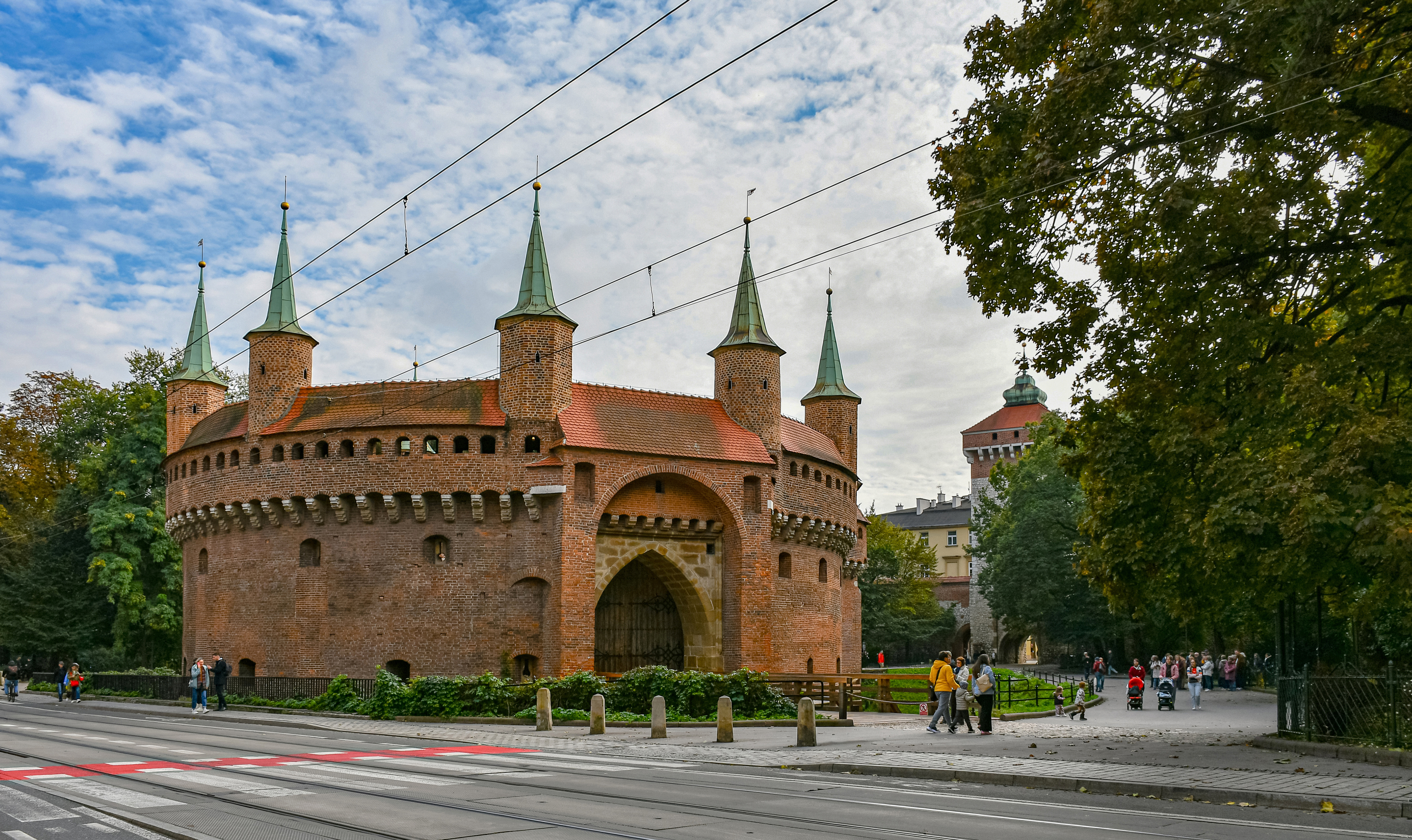
Barbican, Florian Gate and Planty Park (2025)

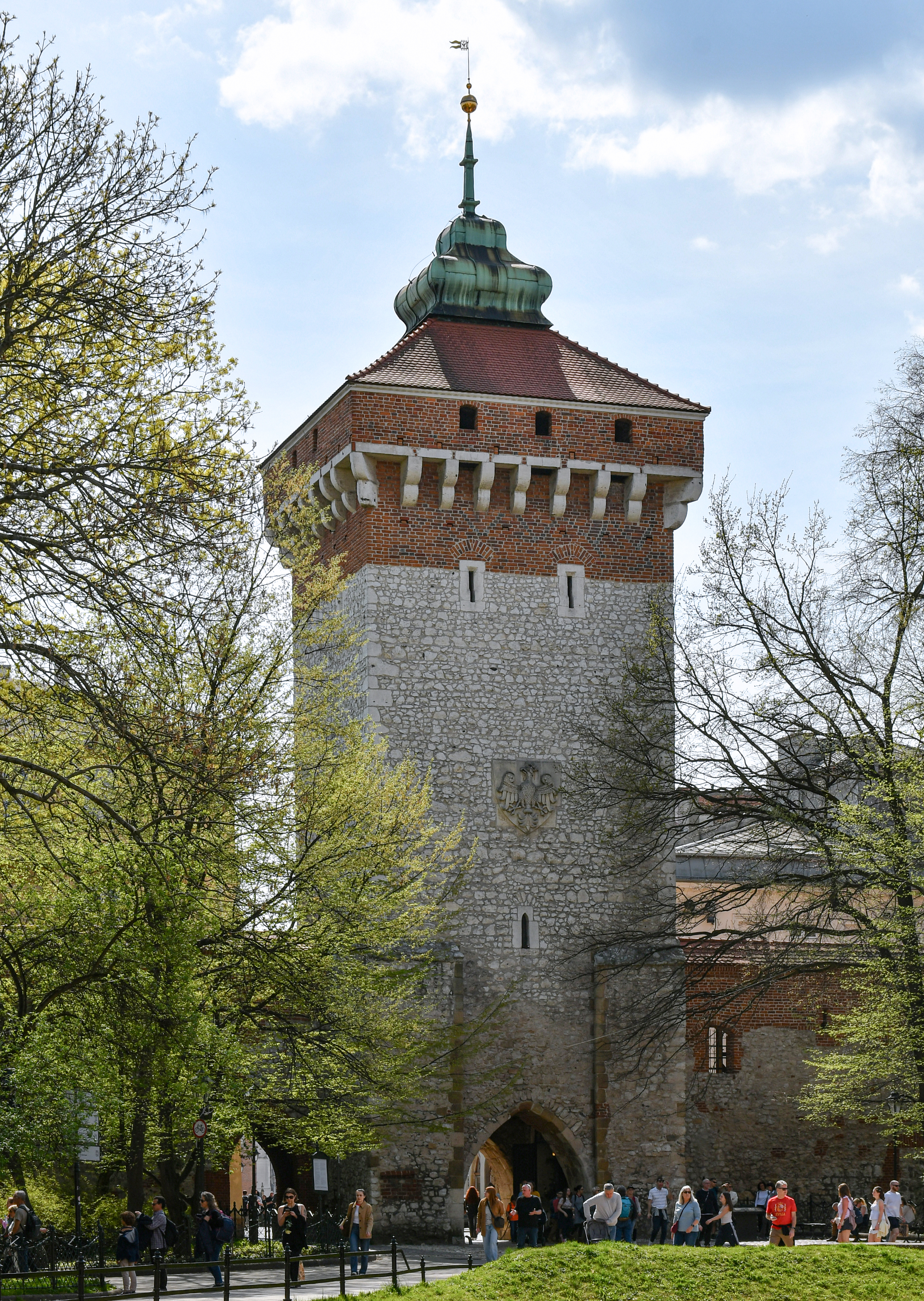
Florian Gate and walls

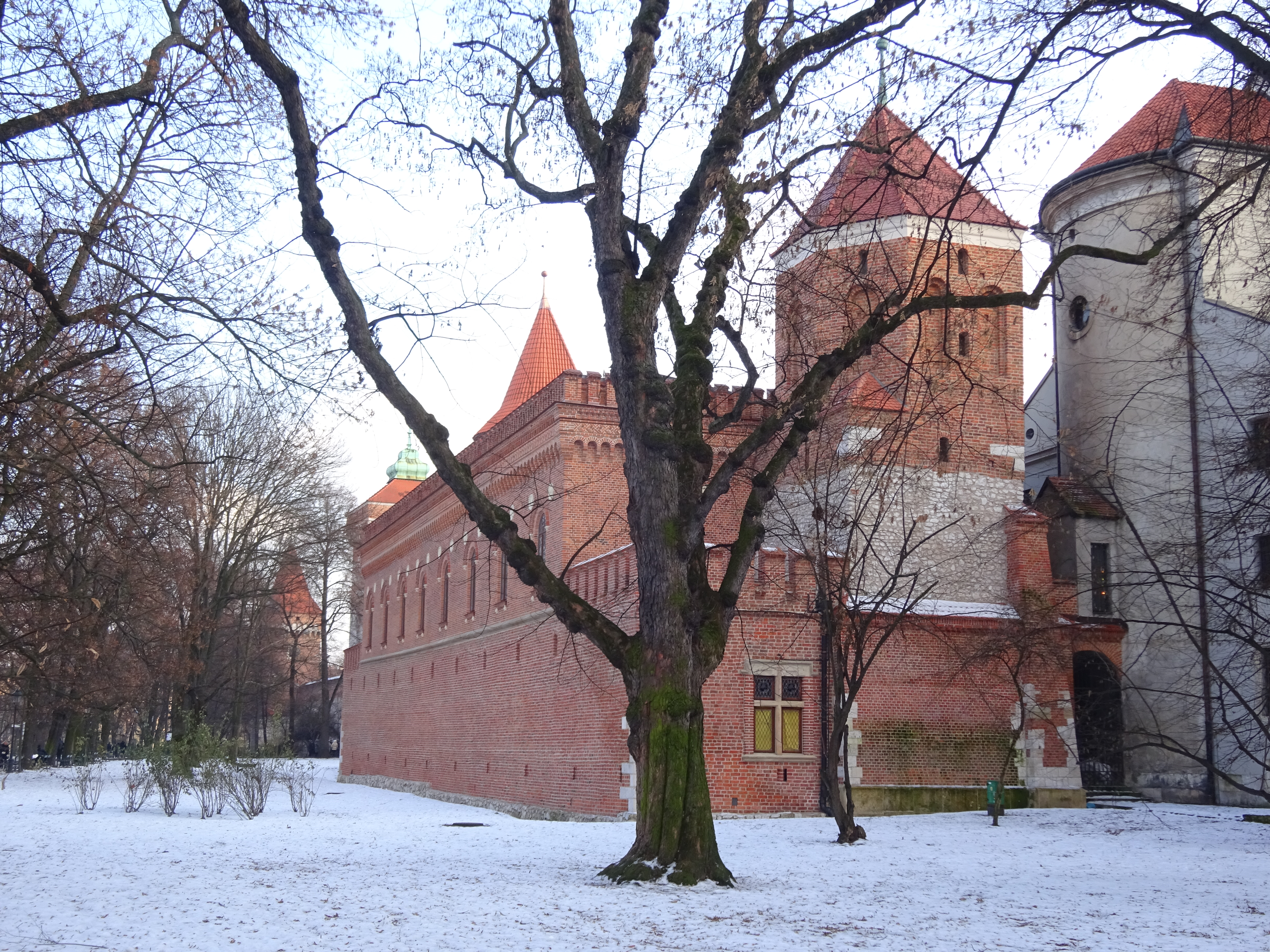
Preserved section of the defensive wall with towers and the City arsenal as seen from the Planty in winter

== Bibliography ==
- Kraków. Jego dzieje i sztuka [Kraków: Its History and Art] (in Polish). Warsaw. 1965.
