= Kraków Barbican =

Polish fortified defensive outpost

Barbican
- Barbakan
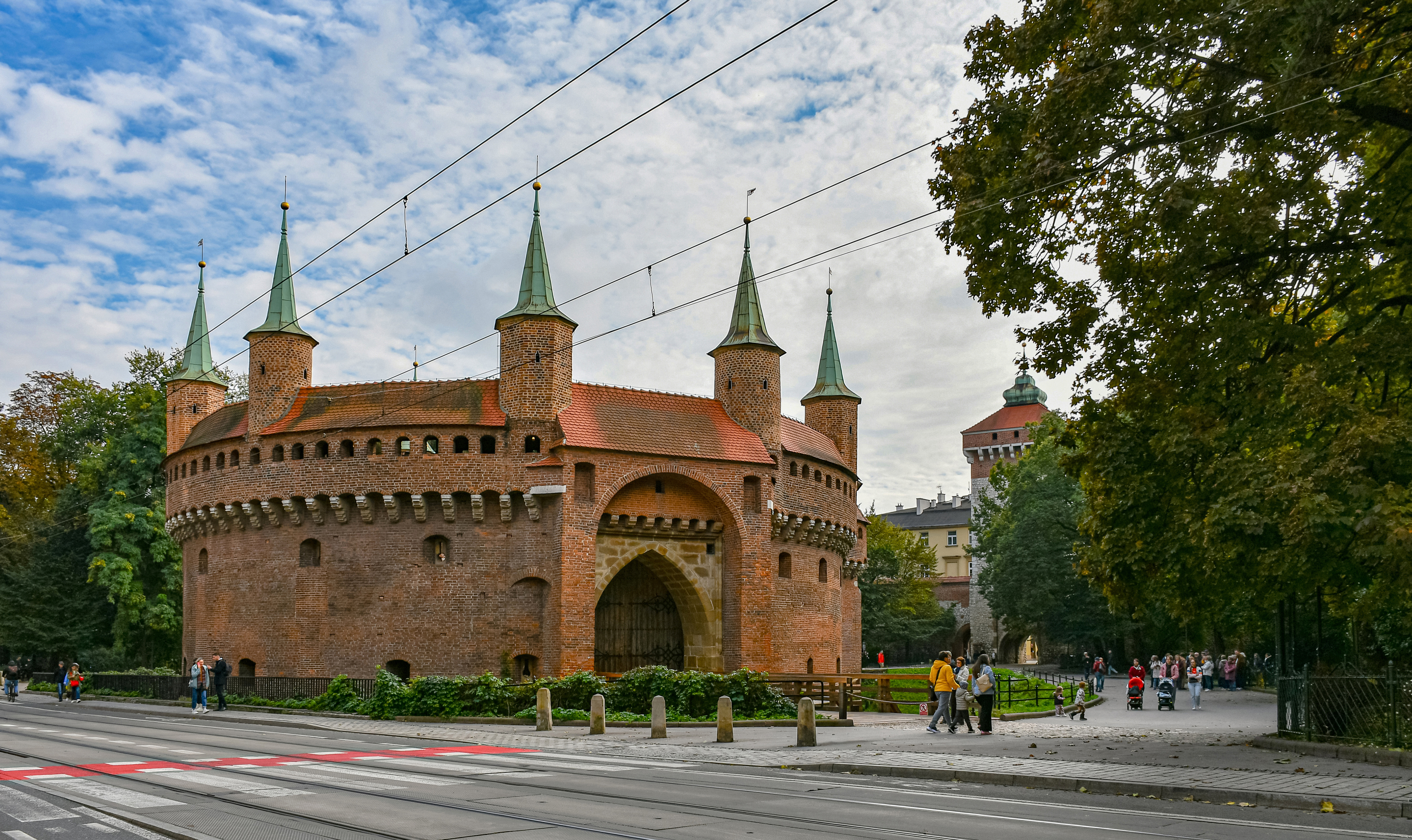
- Barbican and Florian Gate. The former entrance gate to medieval Kraków.
- Established: 1498
- Location: Kraków, Poland
- Coordinates: 50°03′55.7″N 19°56′29.8″E
- Manager: Małgorzata Niechaj
- Director: Michał Niezabitowski
- Curator: Małgorzata Niechaj
- Website: mhk.pl/branches/barbican/

UNESCO World Heritage Site
- Type: Cultural
- Criteria: iv
- Designated: 1978
- Part of: Historic Centre of Kraków
- Reference no.: 29
- Region: Europe and North America

Historic Monument of Poland
- Designated: 1994-09-08
- Part of: Kraków historical city complex
- Reference no.: M.P. 1994 nr 50 poz. 418

The Barbican (Polish: Barbakan) is a barbican – a fortified outpost once connected to the city walls. It is a historic gateway leading into the Old Town of Kraków, Poland. The barbican is one of the few remaining relics of the complex network of fortifications and defensive barriers that once encircled the royal city of Kraków in the south of Poland. It currently serves as a tourist attraction and venue for a variety of exhibitions.

Today the Barbican is under the jurisdiction of The Historical Museum of the City of Kraków. Tourists may tour its interior with its displays outlining the historical development of fortifications in Kraków.

== History ==
The Gothic-style barbican, built around 1498, is one of only three such fortified outposts still surviving in Europe, and the best preserved. It is a moated cylindrical brick structure with an inner courtyard 24.4 meters in diameter, and seven turrets. Its 3-meter-thick walls hold 130 embrasures. The barbican was originally linked to the city walls by a covered passageway that led through St. Florian's Gate and served as a checkpoint for all who entered the city.

The Poles built the barbican fearing an attack by the Ottoman Empire after the defeat of King John I Albert at the Battle of the Cosmin Forest and on his way to Poland in Bukovina where 5,000 Polish soldiers were killed by the Turks. After these successive defeats, the Tatars and Ottomans, with the aid of their vassal Stephen of Moldavia, invaded the southeastern corners of Poland. This took place in the spring of 1498: after crossing the Dniester, the invaders ransacked Red Ruthenia and Podolia, capturing as much as a hundred thousand people and reaching as far as Przeworsk. The walls of Kraków were strengthened and additional fortifications such as the Barbican were built to defend the city in case the Ottomans reached it during the 1485–1503 Polish–Ottoman War.

The Barbican participated in the defense of Kraków in 1587 against the Siege of Kraków (1587) by Maximilian III, Archduke of Austria, in the Siege of Kraków (1655) and the Siege of Kraków (1657), and Russian troops during the Polish–Russian War of 1792.

The building was threatened with demolition early in the 19th century. However, in 1817 two senators of the Free City of Kraków, Feliks Radwanski and Jan Librowski, convinced the Senate to preserve the Barbican and other parts of the old fortifications.

== Design ==
The Barbican was originally a large, circular tower with an interior open space with a diameter of 25 m (82 ft). It was built of brick and stone and stood four stories tall. It had seven watch towers. The walls were about 3 m (9.8 ft) at their base and 0.5 m (1 ft 7.7 in) at the top. The Barbican's exterior gate, the Kleparz Gate, was protected by a large, semi-circular moat 26 m (85.3 ft) wide and 6 m (19.7 ft) deep.

== Features ==
Considered a masterpiece of medieval military engineering, the circular fortress of the Kraków's Barbakan was added to the city's fortifications along the coronation route in the late 15th century, based on Arabic rather than European defensive strategy. On its eastern wall, a tablet commemorates the feat of a Kraków burgher, Marcin Oracewicz, who, during the Bar Confederation, defended the town against the Russians and shot their Colonel Panin, according to a legend, using a czamara button instead of a bullet.

== Gallery ==
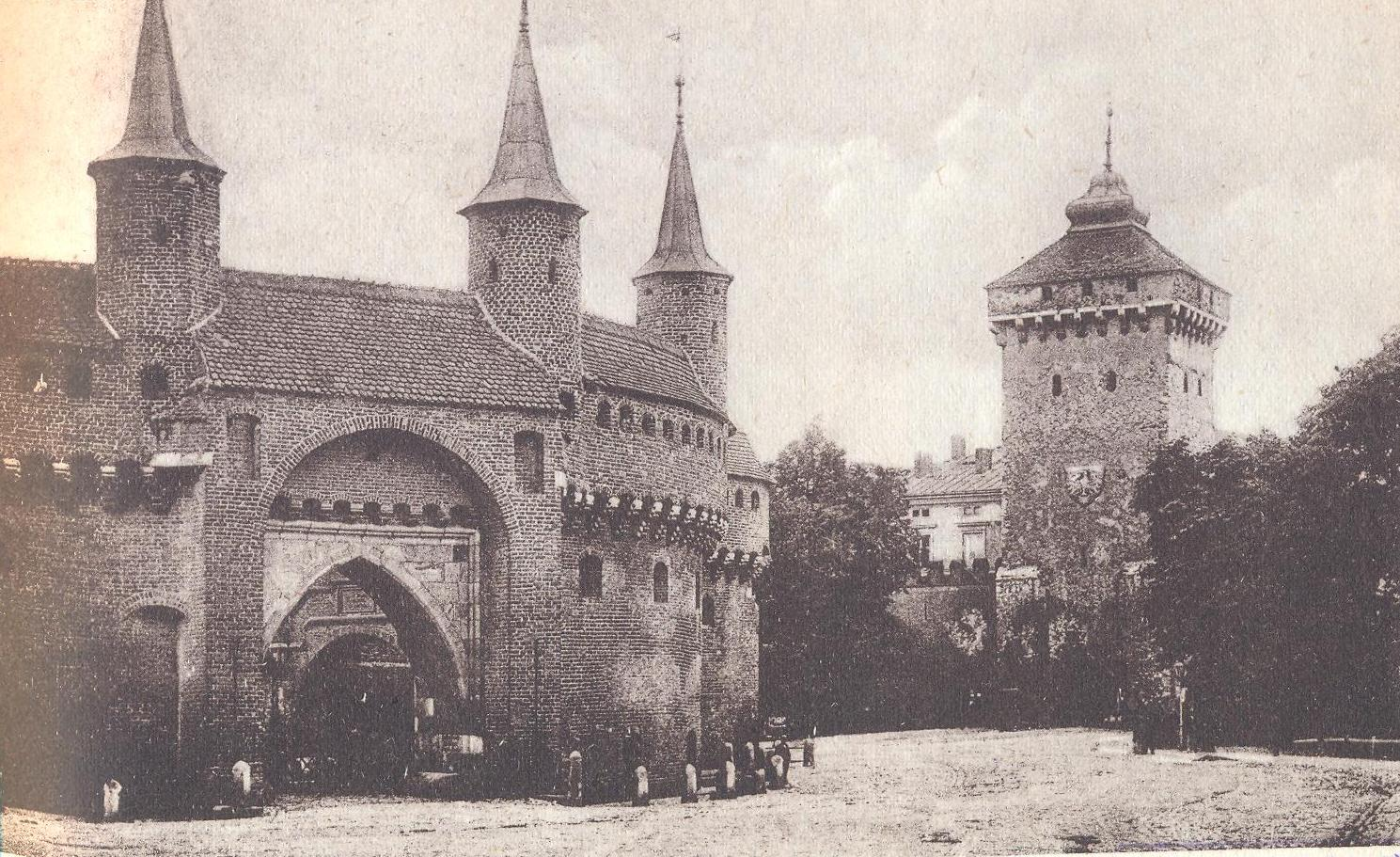
Kraków Barbican in the 1930s

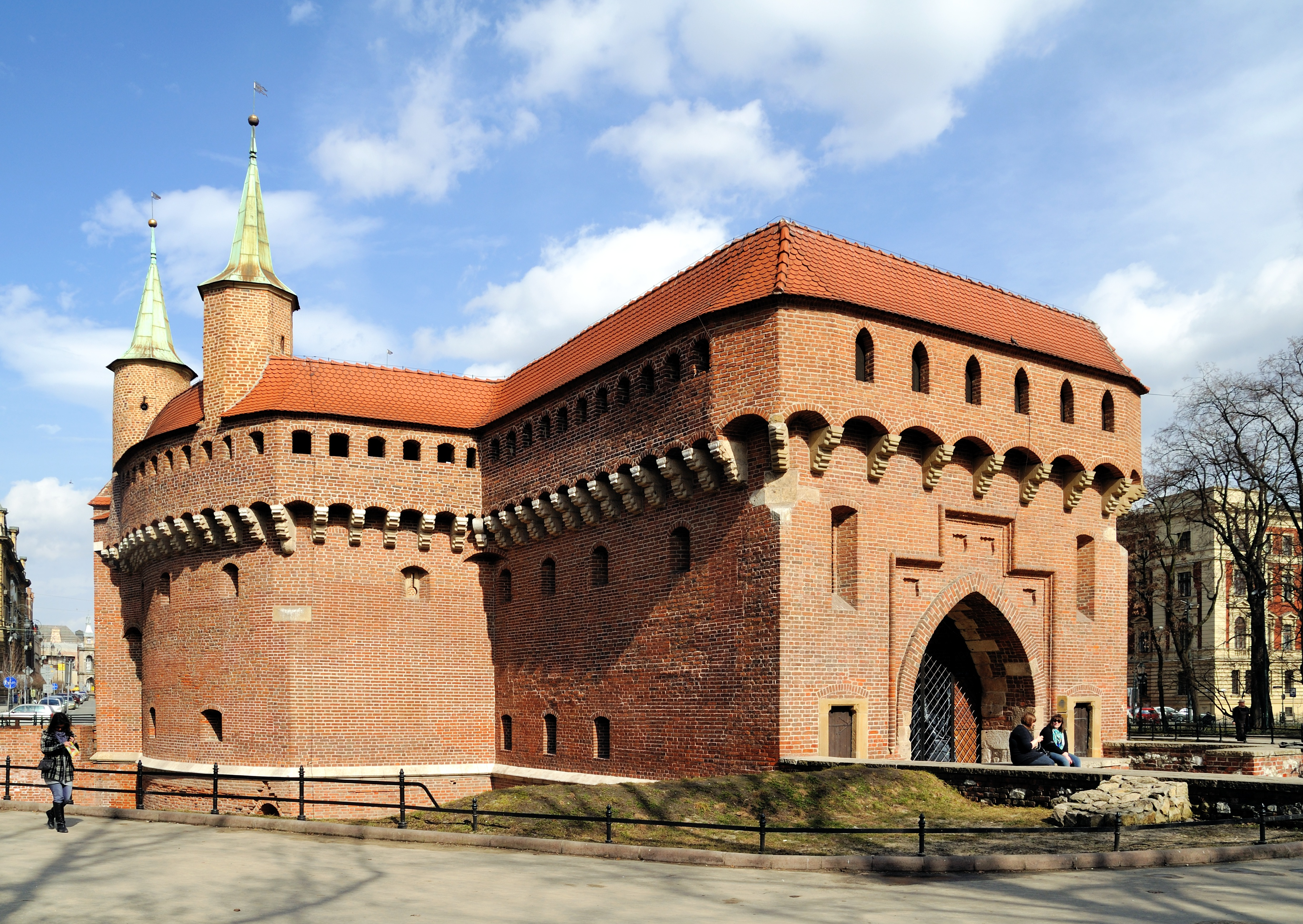
Gate to the former fortified passage facing St. Florian's Gate to the south

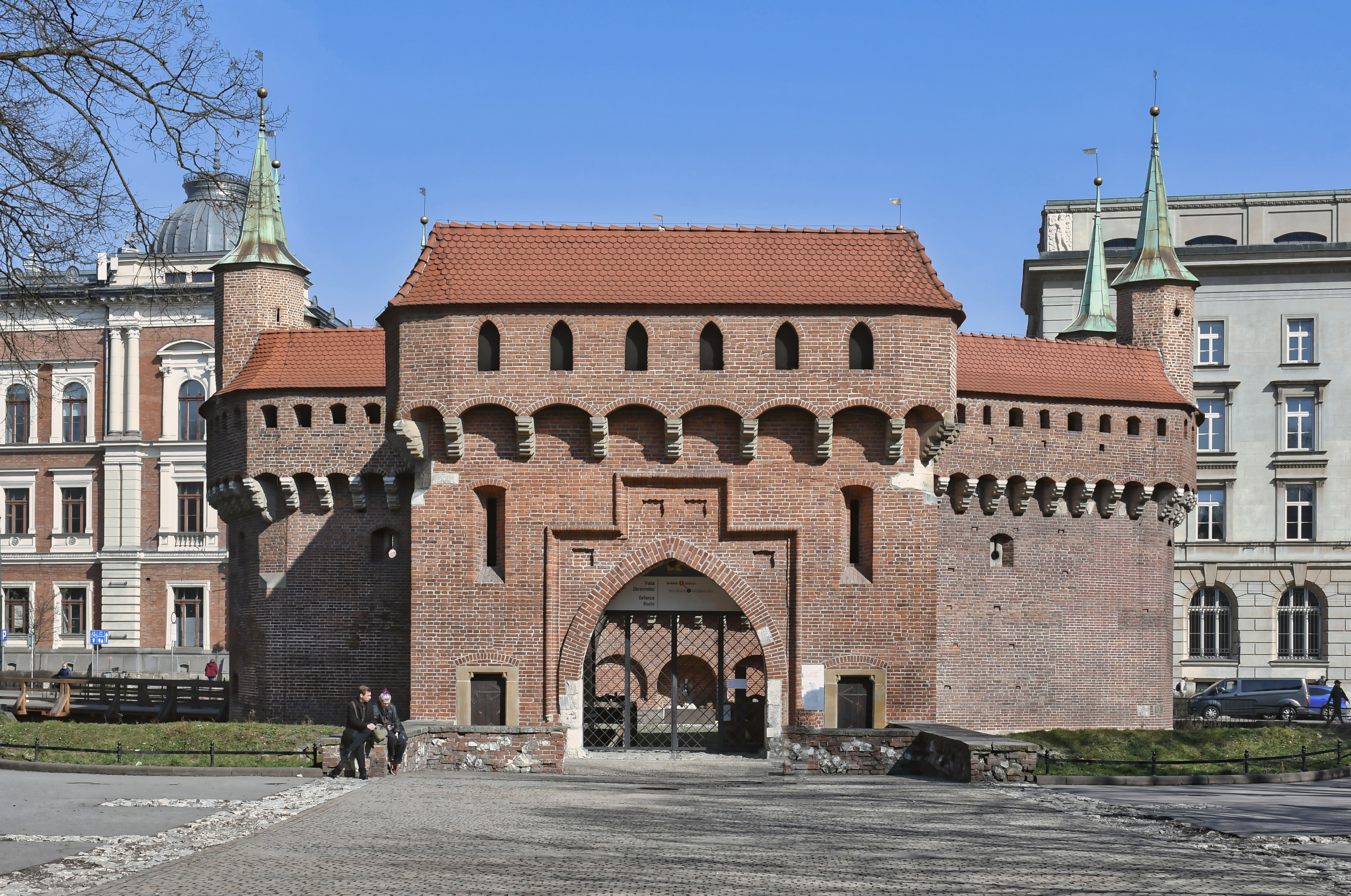
Barbican entrance, view from St. Florian's Gate

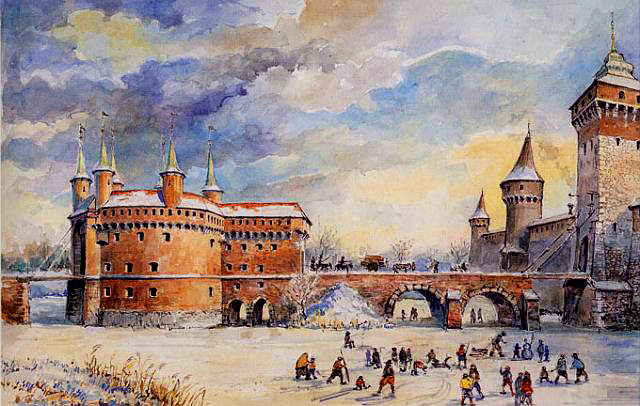
Barbican's defensive walls and the connecting bridge from before their 19th century dismantlement

== See also ==
- Planty Park, which encircles Kraków's Old Town (Stare Miasto)
- Warsaw Barbican

== Bibliography ==
- Marek Żukow-Karczewski, The Barbican (Barbakan), "KRAKÓW" Magazyn Kulturalny, Special Edition (English-language version), "KRAKÓW" Magazine, Kraków, 1991, p. 58-59.
