= Marek Żukow-Karczewski =

Polish historian, journalist, and author (born 1961)

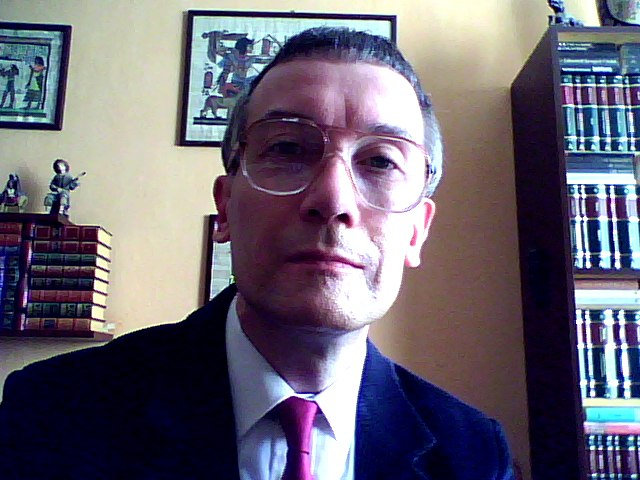
- Marek Żukow-Karczewski in 2015
- Born: 6 May 1961 (age 65)
- Occupations: Historian and journalist
- Years active: 1981–present

Marek Żukow-Karczewski (born 6 May 1961) is a Polish historian, journalist, and author who specializes in the history of Poland, especially Kraków, and in the history of architecture and environmental issues. He is a descendant of the Polish noble family Karczewski and of the Russian noble family Żukow (Russian: Жуков, English: Zhukov).

== Biography ==
Since 1980 Marek Żukow-Karczewski studied history at the Jagiellonian University and worked to preserve monuments in Kraków. He is the co-organizer of the Obywatelski Komitet Ratowania Krakowa (English: Citizens Committee for Saving Kraków) and served as scientific secretary from 1981 - 1994. Among other things, he dealt with the restoration of historical monuments in the Rakowicki Cemetery. He is the author of hundreds publications and articles about the palaces, defensive castles, the former technology, the history of medicine and of old culture and tradition. His work has been published in magazines and newspapers including in alphabetic order "Aura" - Ochrona Środowiska ("Aura - A Monthly for the Protection and Shaping of Human Environment"), "Czas Krakowski" ("Time of Kraków"), "Echo Krakowa" ("Echo of Kraków"), "Gazeta Krakowska", "Kalendarz Serca Jezusowego" ("Calendar of the Heart of Jesus"), "Kraków" - Magazyn Kulturalny ("Kraków - Cultural Magazine"), "Posłaniec Serca Jezusowego" ("Messenger of the Heart of Jesus"), "Przekrój", "Życie Literackie" ("Literary Life") and on web portals (among other: Ekologia.pl, Wolne Media). Also collaborated with Polish Television and Polish Radio in Kraków. Since 1990 he is a member of the Polski Klub Ekologiczny (English: Polish Ecological Club). In 1991 he became a member of the Stowarzyszenie Dziennikarzy Polskich (English: Association of Polish Journalists). He is also a member of the International Federation of Journalists.

== Publications (selected) ==
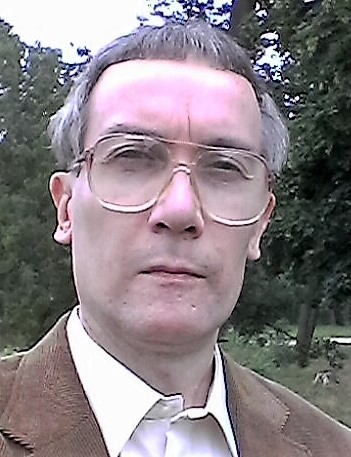
Marek Żukow-Karczewski in his garden (July 2016)

- Sprawa Raperswilska (Raperswilska affair), 1987
- Stanisław August w Petersburgu (Stanisław August in St. Petersburg), 1987
- Pojedynki w dawnej Polsce (Duels in the former Poland), 1987
- Klejnoty i insygnia koronacyjne w dawnej Polsce. Prawdy i legendy (Crown jewels and insignia in the former Poland. Truth and legend), 1987
- Wielkie pogrzeby w dawnej Polsce (Big funerals in old Poland), 1988
- Syberyjskie losy Piotra Wysockiego (Siberian fate of Piotr Wysocki), 1988
- Największe pożary w Polsce i na świecie (The largest fires in Poland and around the world), 2012
- Największe powodzie minionego wieku w Polsce i na świecie (The biggest floods in the last century in Poland and around the world), 2012
- Gra w kości - pierwsze spotkania z człowiekiem kopalnym (Bone game - the first meeting with the men fossil), 2013
- Eksperymenty i doświadczenia medyczne na zwierzętach (Medical experiments and experience on animals), 2013
- Łuk - oręż bogów i ludzi (Bow a weapon of gods and man), 2014
- Robinson na Syberii (Robinson Crusoe on Siberia), 2016

== See also ==
- History of Kraków
- History of Poland
- Krakow Barbican
- List of Polish people
- Polish Crown Jewels
- Russian nobility
- Szczerbiec
- Szlachta
