= St. Florian's Gate =

City walls, gothic tower in Kraków, Poland

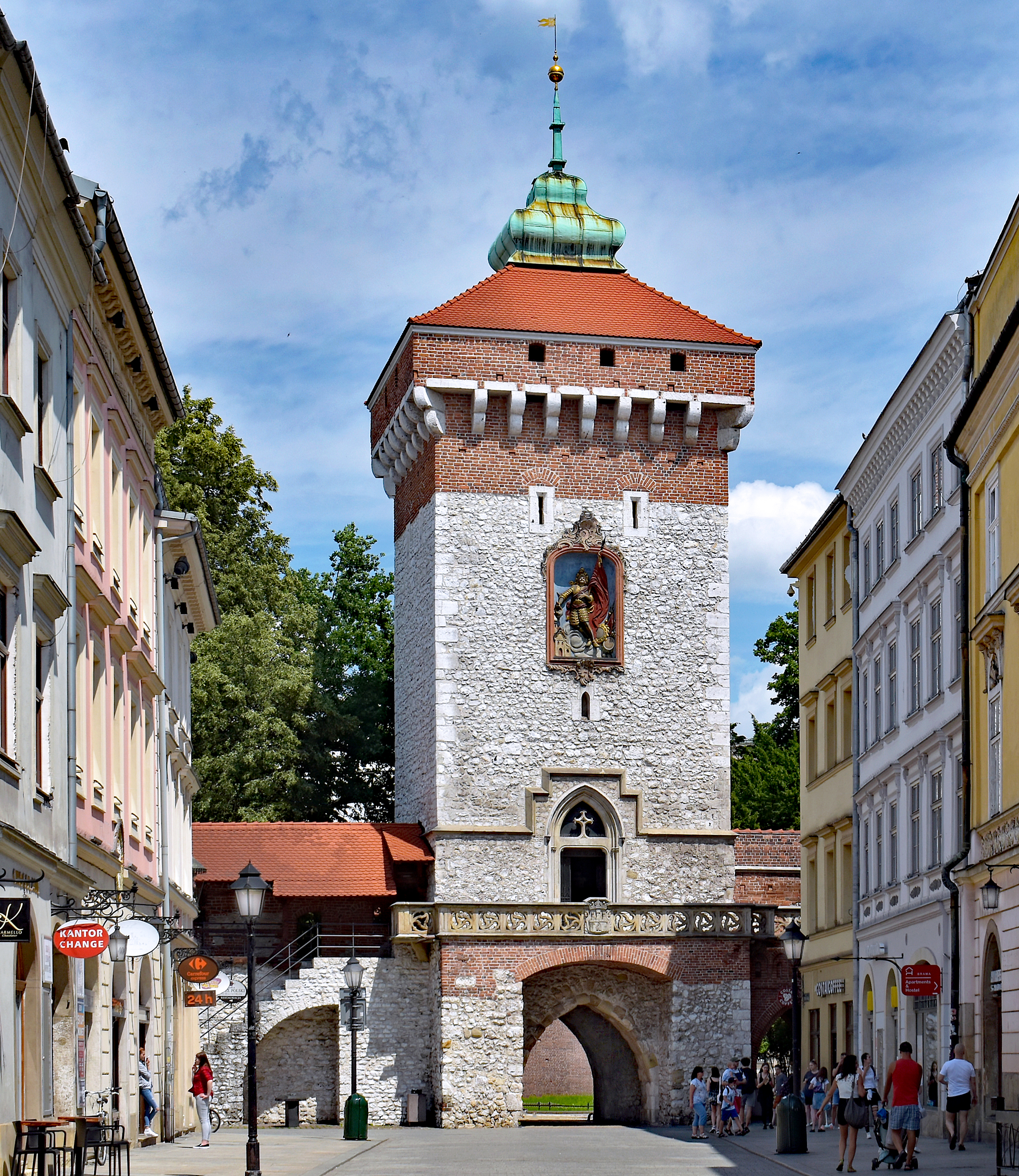
- Interactive map of the St. Florian's Gate area

General information
- Type: defensive city walls
- Architectural style: gothic
- Location: Poland, Kraków; Pijarska Street
- Coordinates: 50°03′53.6″N 19°56′28.9″E
- Construction started: 14th century

Height
- Architectural: 33 m (108 ft)

UNESCO World Heritage Site
- Type: Cultural
- Criteria: iv
- Designated: 1978
- Part of: Historic Centre of Kraków
- Reference no.: 29
- Region: Europe and North America

Historic Monument of Poland
- Designated: 1994-09-08
- Part of: Kraków historical city complex
- Reference no.: M.P. 1994 nr 50 poz. 418

St. Florian's Gate (Polish: Brama Floriańska) in Kraków, Poland, is one of the best-known Polish Gothic towers, and a focal point of Kraków's Old Town.

It was built about the 14th century as a rectangular Gothic tower of "wild stone", part of the city fortifications against Mongol attack.

== History ==
The tower, first mentioned in 1307, had been built as part of a protective rampart around Kraków after the Tatar attack of 1241 which destroyed most of the city. The permit for the construction of new city defenses featuring stone watchtowers, fortified gates and a moat was issued by Prince Leszek II the Black in 1285. The gate named after St. Florian became the main entryway to the Old Town. It was connected by a long bridge to the circular barbican (barbakan), erected of brick, on the other side of the moat. The Gate was manned by the Kraków Furriers Guild. According to records, by 1473 there were 17 towers defending the city; a century later, there were 33. At the height of its existence, the wall featured 47 watchtowers and eight gates. Also, in 1565–66 a municipal arsenal was built next to St. Florian's Gate.

The Gate tower is 33.5 metres tall. The Baroque metal "helmet" that crowns the gate, constructed in 1660 and renovated in 1694, adds another metre to the height of the gate. Brama Floriańska is the only city gate, of the original eight built in the Middle Ages, that was not dismantled during the 19th-century "modernization" of Kraków. The adjoining city walls and two additional, smaller towers had been preserved and today host street displays of amateur art available for purchase.

The south face of St. Florian's Gate is adorned with an 18th-century bas-relief of St. Florian. The tower's north face bears a stone eagle that was carved in 1882 by Zygmunt Langman, based on a design by painter Jan Matejko. Inside the gate is an altar with a late-Baroque copy of a classicist painting of the Piaskowa Madonna.

== Royal Route ==
Kraków's Royal Road begins at St. Florian's Gate, and the gate is a terminating vista at its north end. Through it once entered kings and princes, foreign envoys and distinguished guests, and parades and coronation processions. They travelled up ulica Floriańska (St. Florian's Street) to the Main Market Square, and on up ulica Grodzka (Castle Street) to Wawel Castle.

By the beginning of the 19th century, the expanding city had largely outgrown the confines of the old city walls. The walls had been falling into disrepair for a hundred years due to lack of maintenance after the foreign Partitions of Poland. The stagnant moat fed by the Rudawa River was a dump for illegal garbage and posed health concerns for the city. Such dire circumstances inspired Emperor Franz I of Austro-Hungary to order the dismantling of the city walls. However, on January 13, 1817, Professor Feliks Radwański of Jagiellonian University managed to convince the Session of the Senate of the Republic of Kraków to legislate the partial preservation of the old fortifications—St. Florian's Gate and the adjoining barbican.

== City walls ==
Until the 19th century, Kraków had massive medieval city walls. The inner wall was some 2.4 meters wide and 6–7 meters high. Ten meters outside the inner wall was an outer, lower one. The walls were punctuated by defensive towers 10 metres high. In the 19th century — just before they were demolished by the Austrian authorities — there were 47 towers still standing. Now there are only three Gothic towers left in all Kraków: the Carpenters', Haberdashers' and Joiners' Towers, connected to St. Florian's Gate by walls several dozen meters long.

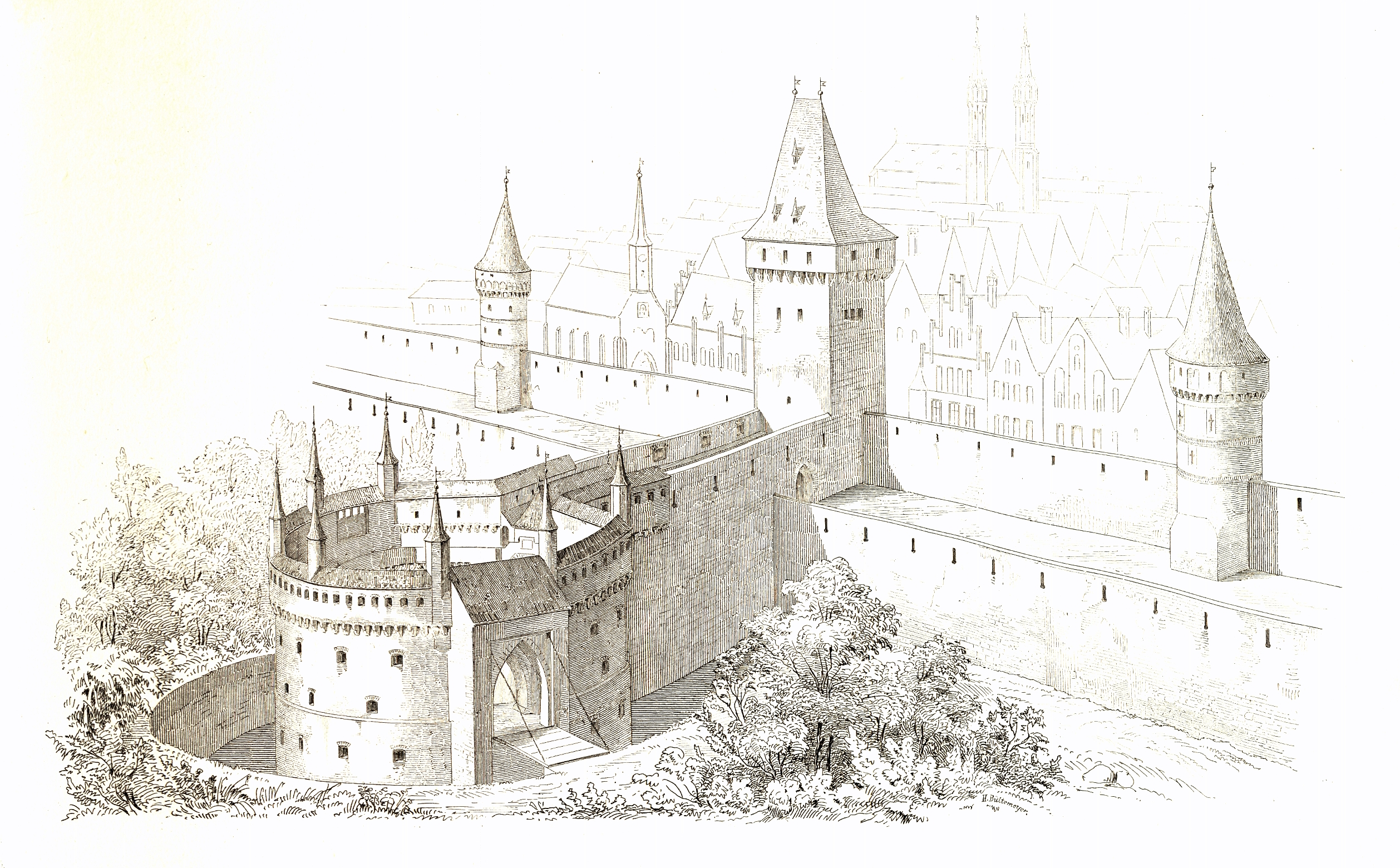
Original appearance of St. Florian's Gate and the barbican (1857)

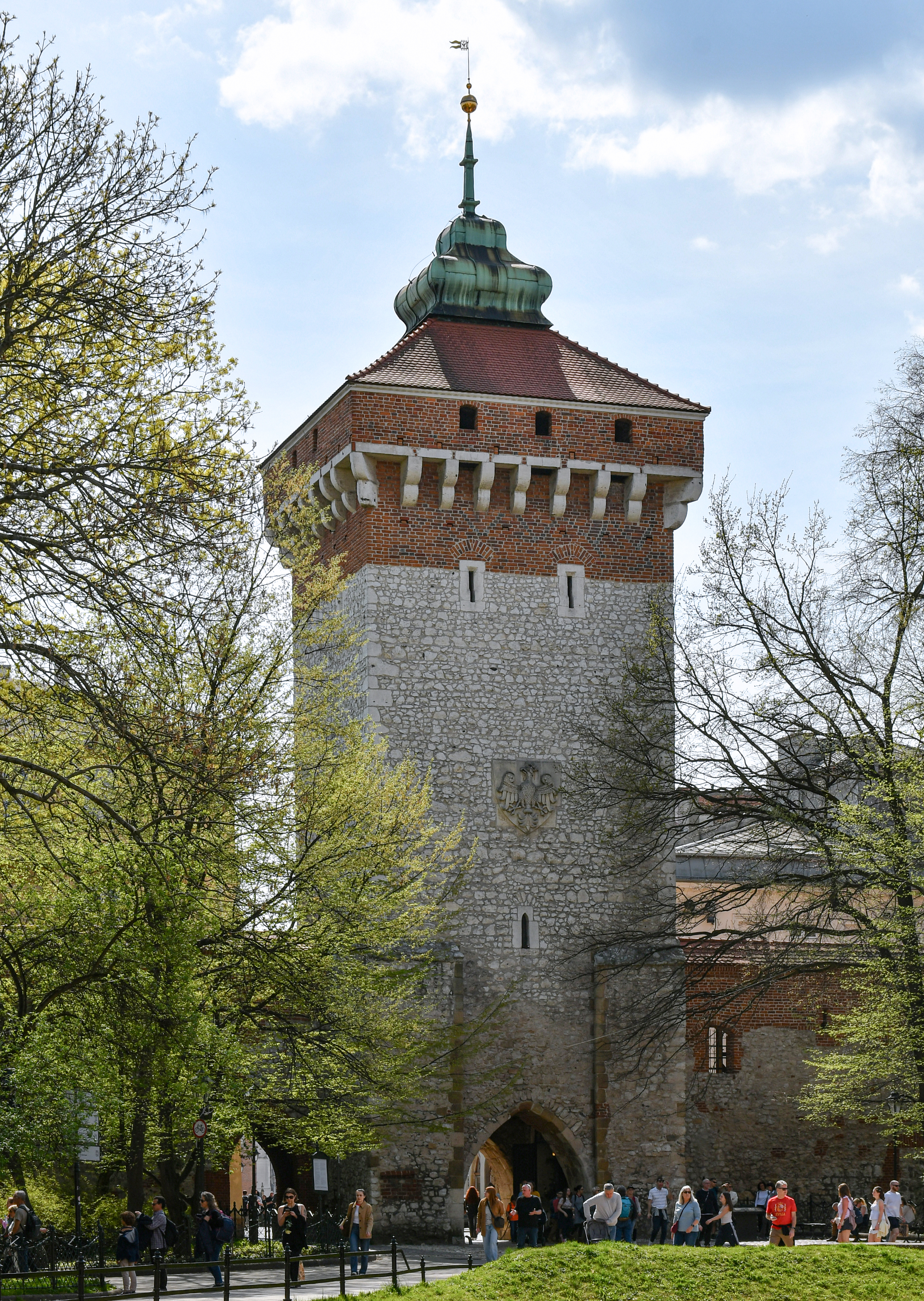
St. Florian's Gate, view from the Planty Park

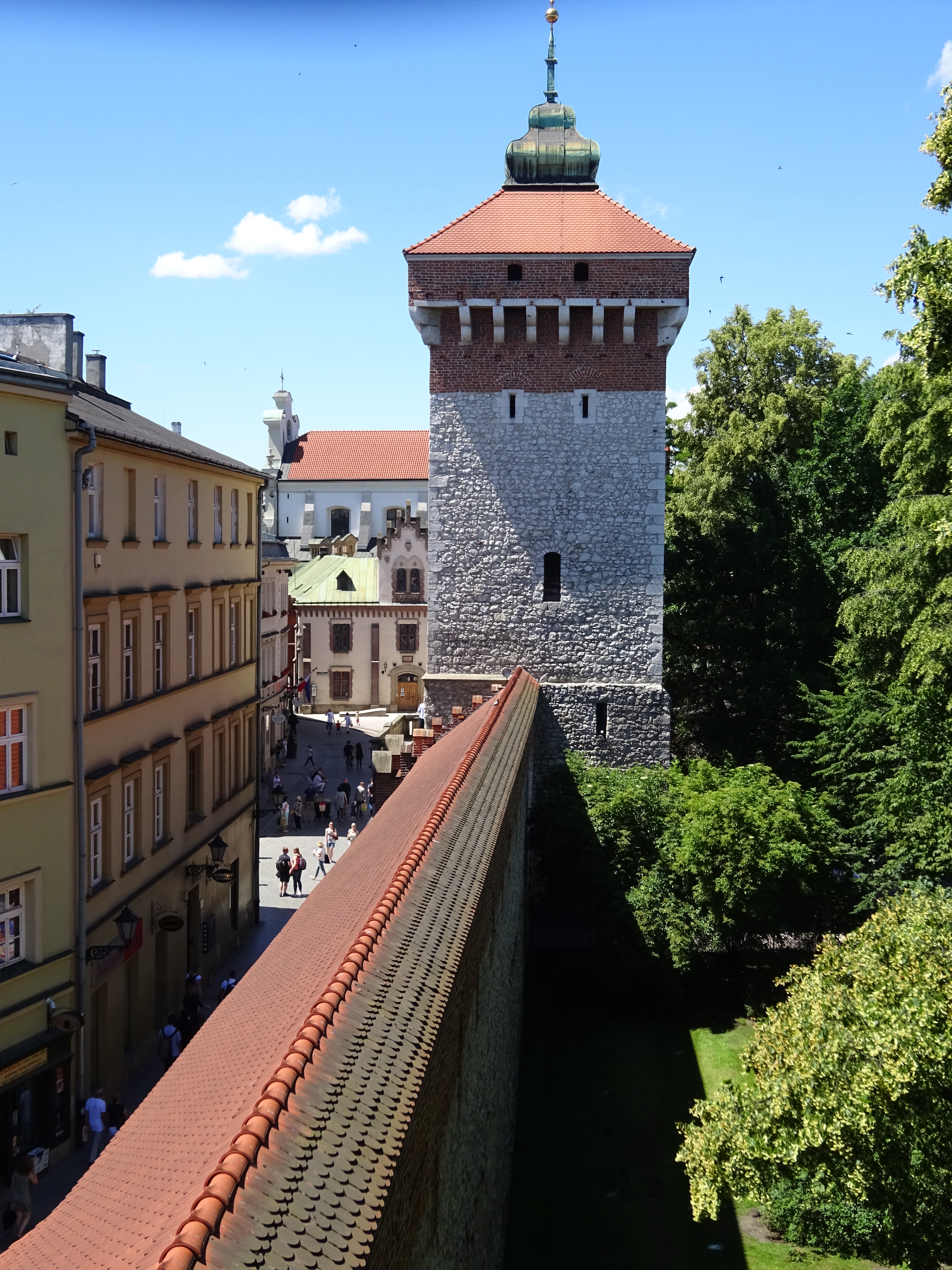
St. Florian's Gate and defensive walls

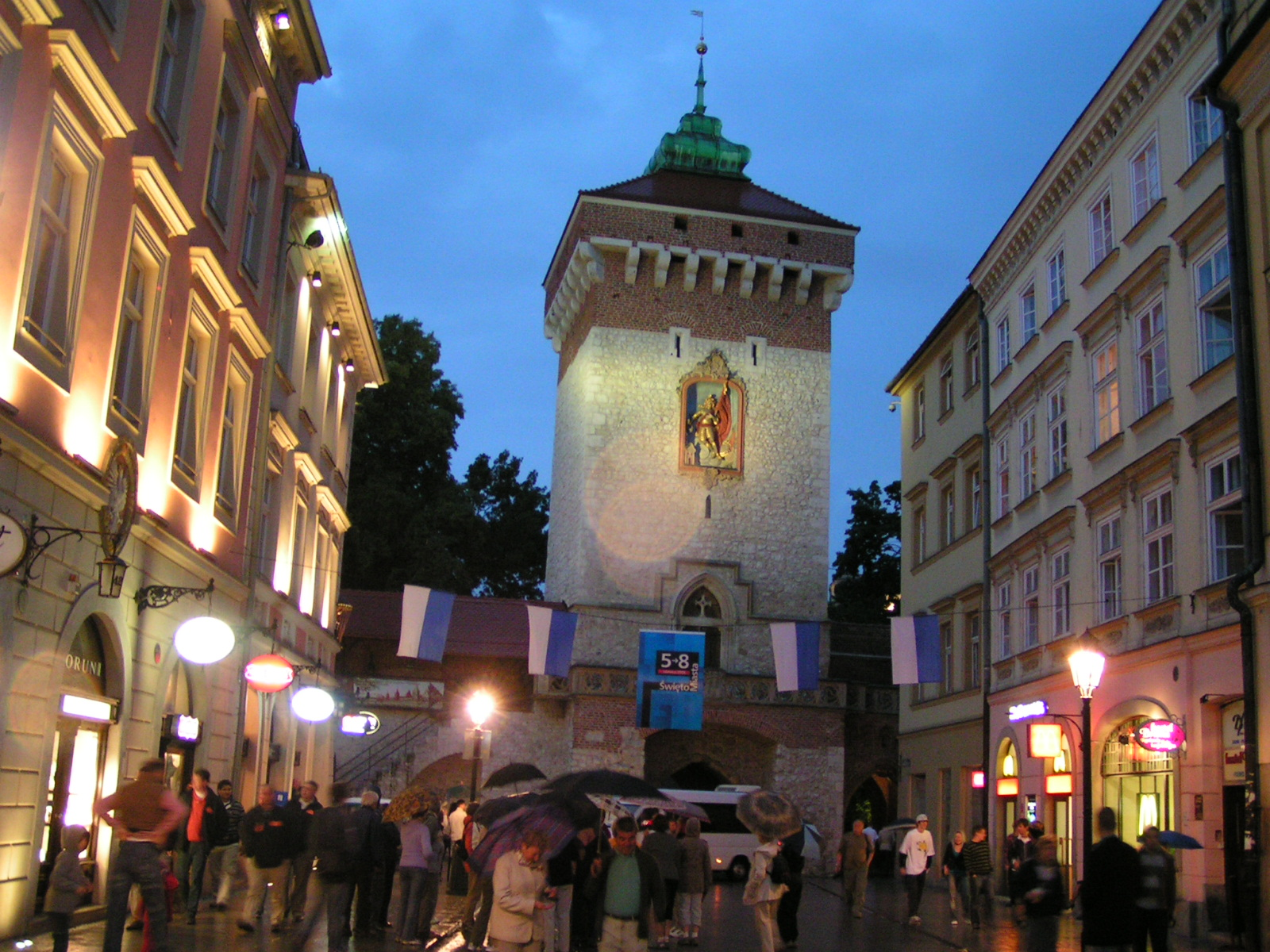
St. Florian's gate at dusk

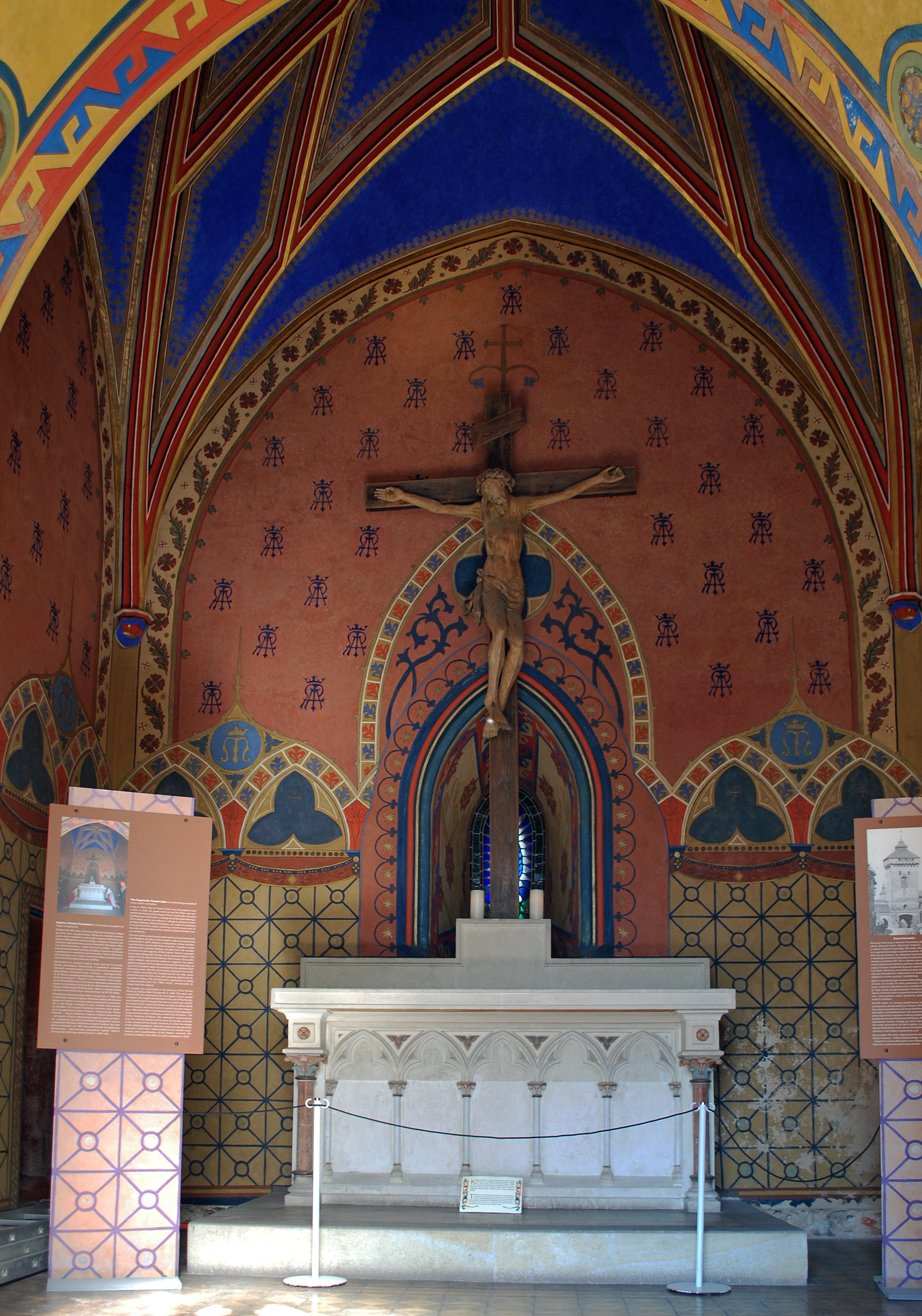
Princes Czartoryski Family Chapel

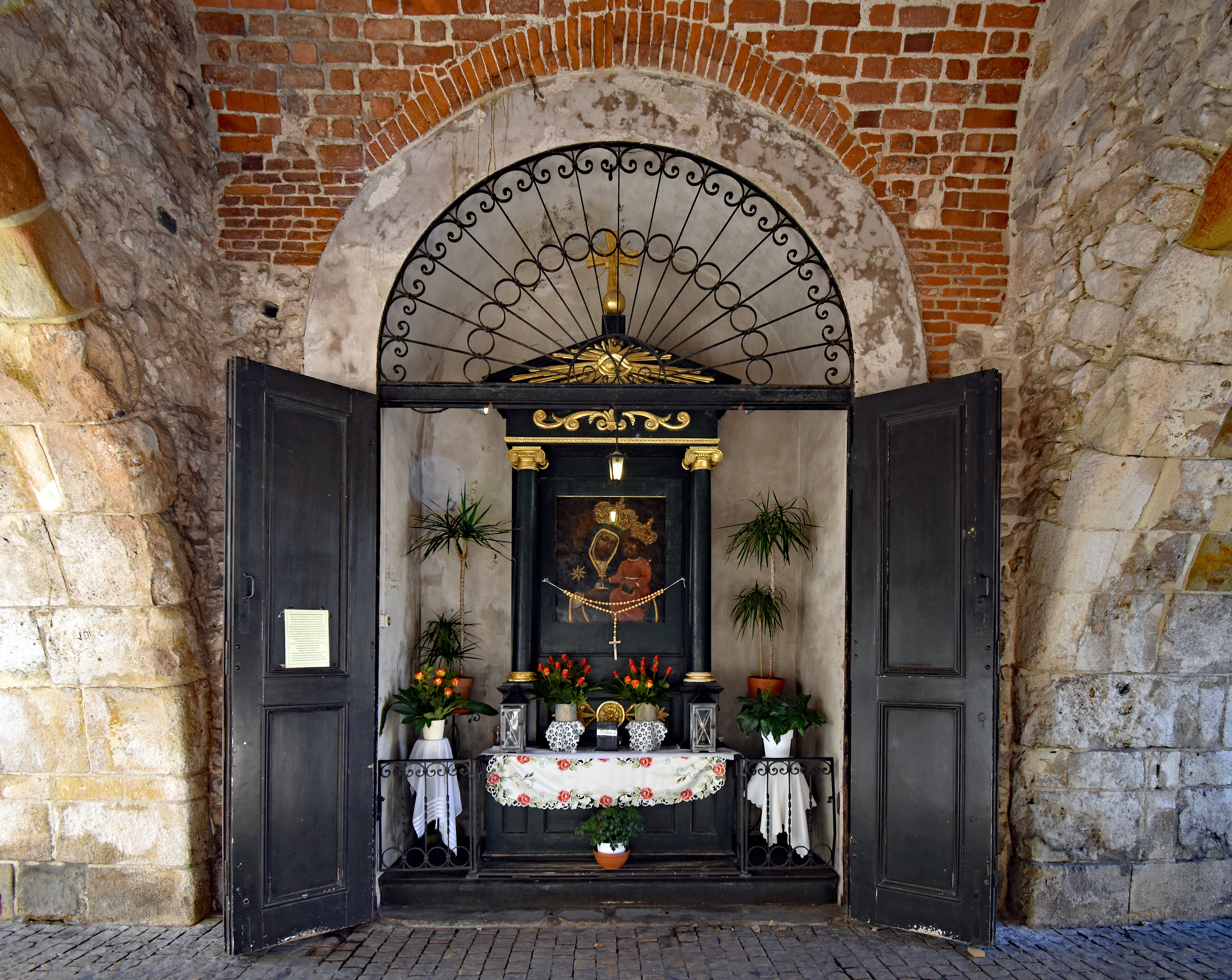
Chapel inside St. Florian's Gate

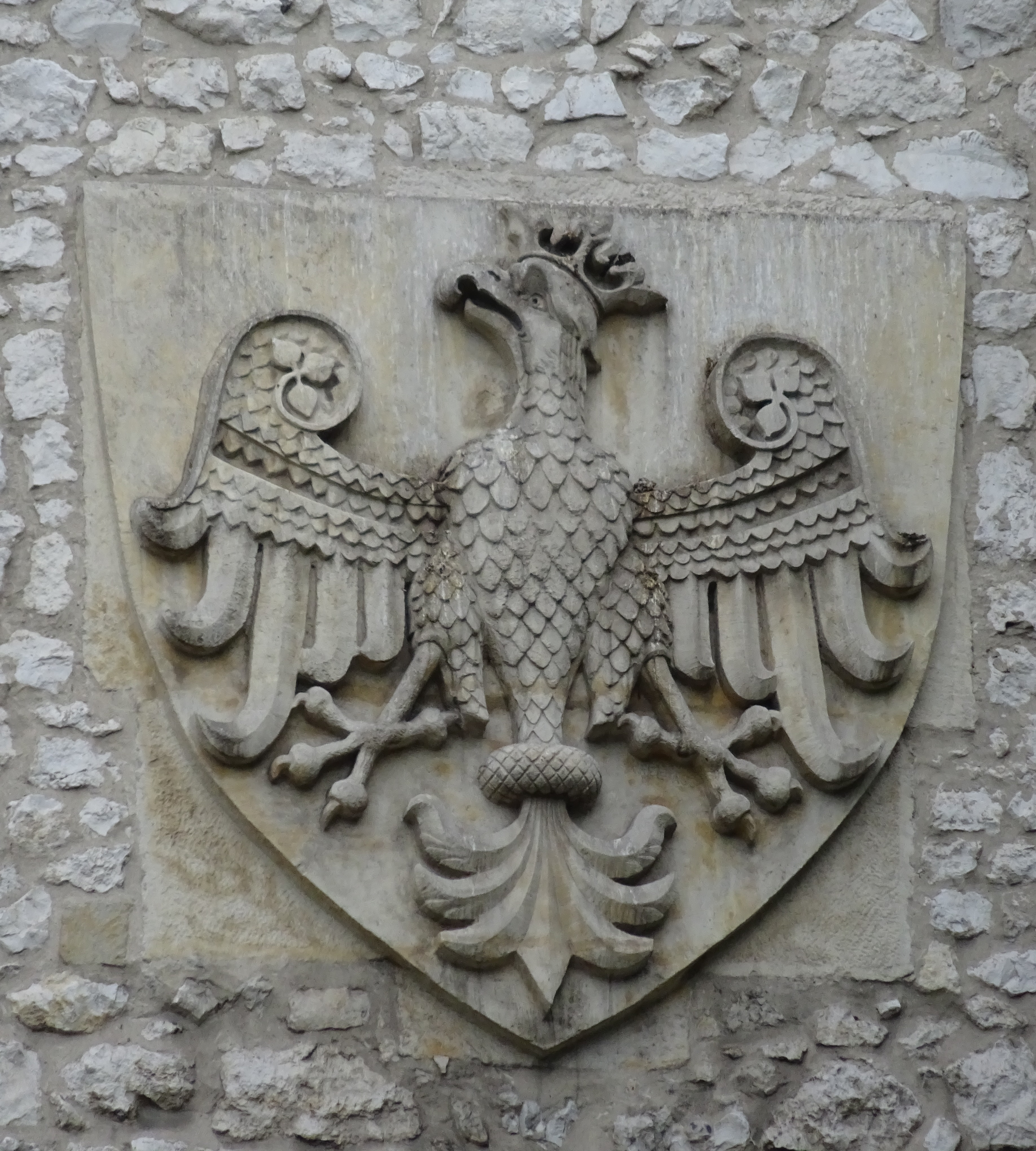
Bas-relief of Piast Eagle, designed by Jan Matejko, over gate entrance

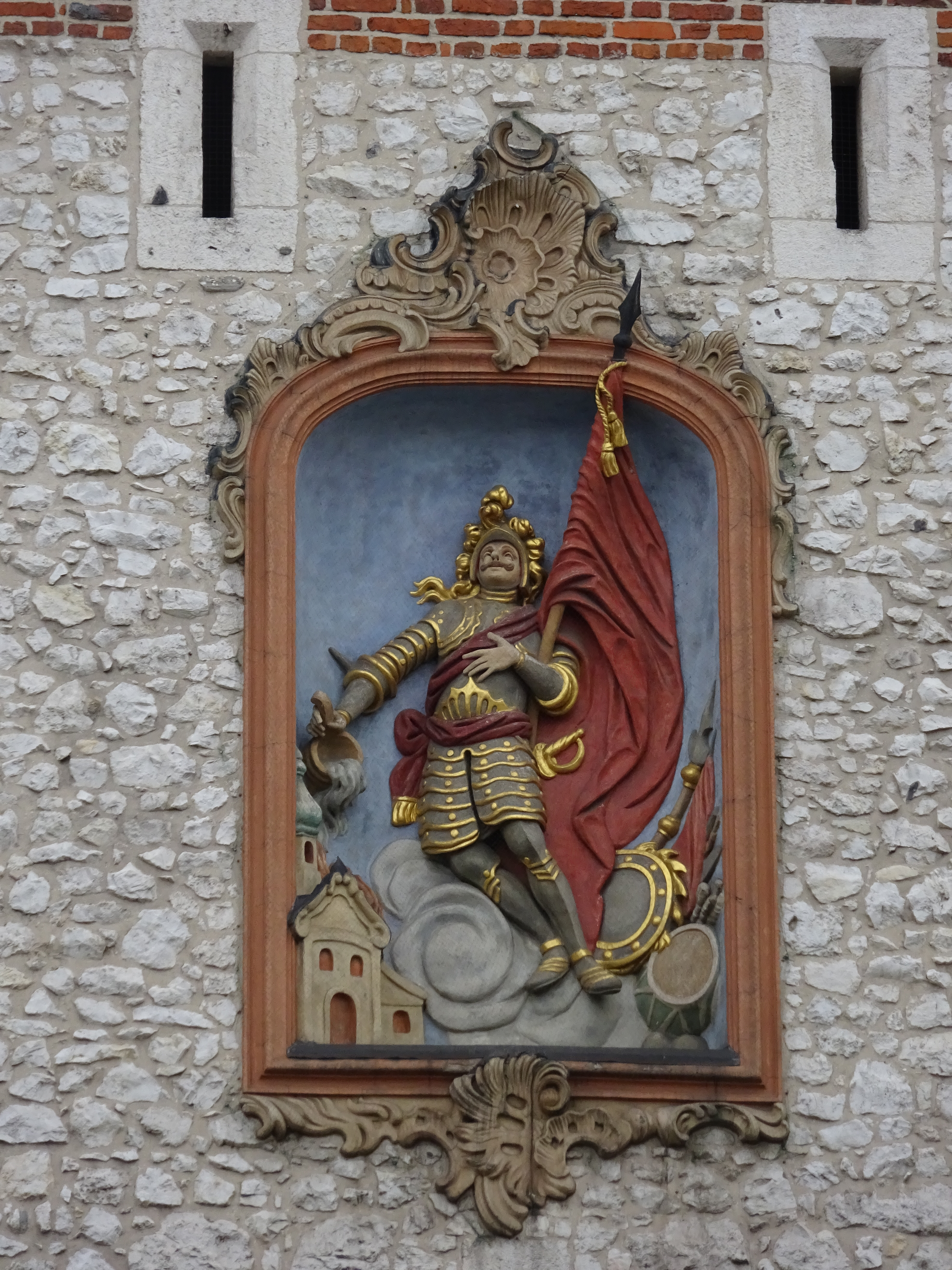
18th-century bas-relief depicting Saint Florian

== See also ==
- History of Poland
- St. Florian's Church
- Kraków Gate in Lublin
