= Royal Road, Kraków =

Road in Kraków, Poland

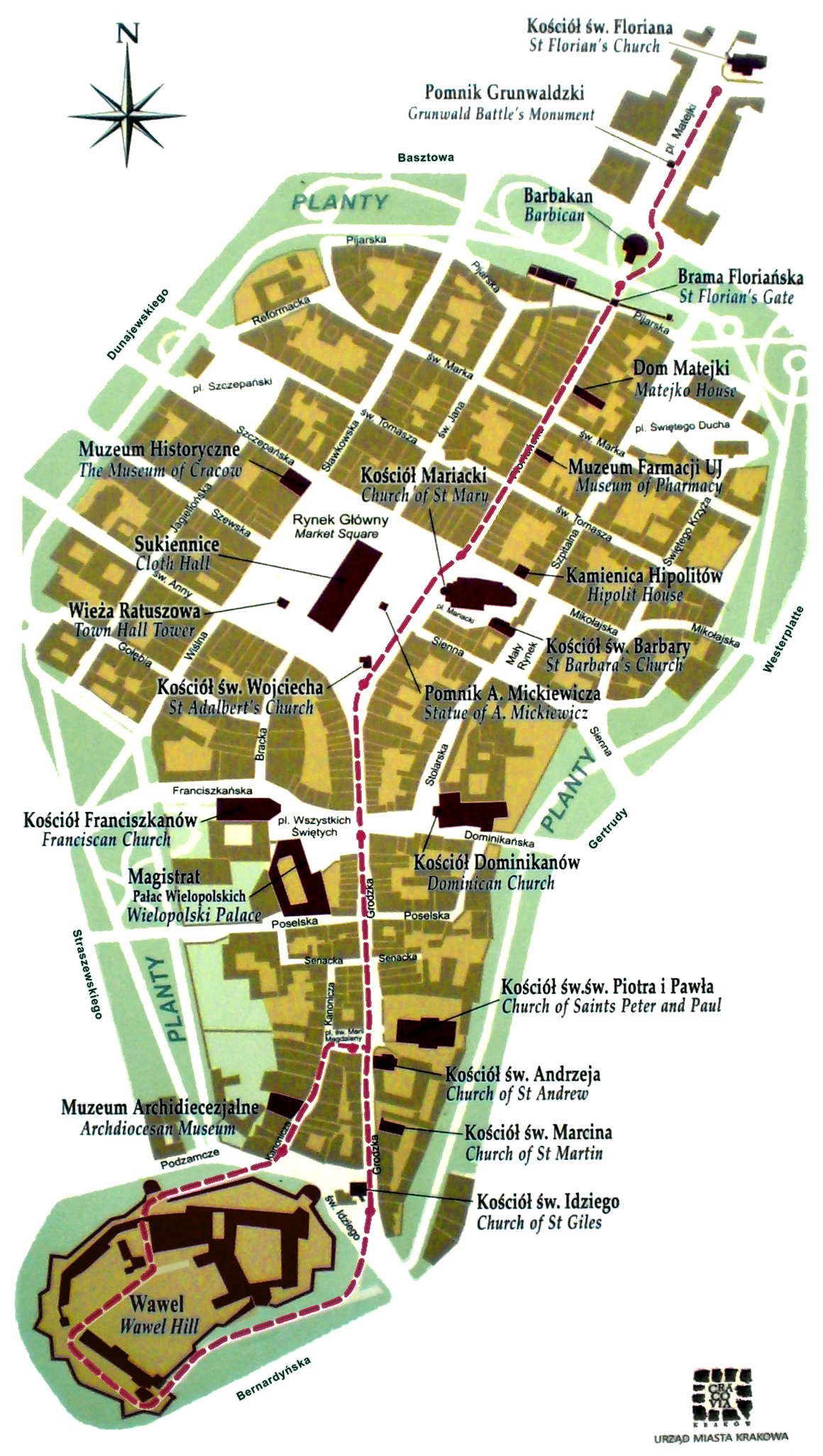
Map of Kraków Old Town district with Royal Road marked in red

The Royal Road or Royal Route (Polish: Droga Królewska, IPA: [ˈdrɔɡa kruˈlɛfska]) in Kraków, Poland, begins at the northern end of the medieval Old Town and continues south through the centre of town towards Wawel Hill, where the old royal residence, Wawel Castle, is located. The Royal Road passes some of the most prominent historic landmarks of Poland's royal capital, providing a suitable background to coronation processions and parades, kings' and princes' receptions, foreign envoys and guests of distinction traveling from a far country to their destination at Wawel.

The Royal Road starts outside the northern flank of the old city walls in the medieval suburb of Kleparz, now a central district of Kraków. It begins at St. Florian's Church (Kościół św. Floriana), containing the relics of St. Florian – the Patron Saint of Poland – miraculously saved numerous times in the 12th, 16th and 17th centuries. St. Florian's Church was also the starting point for royal funeral processions, concluding at Wawel Cathedral.

The Royal Road crosses Matejko Square (pl. Matejki), passes the Academy of Fine Arts (Akademia Sztuk Pięknych) on the right-hand side and crosses Basztowa Street – to the medieval barbican (Barbakan). The Gothic-style Barbakan, built in 1499, is one of only three such fortified outposts still surviving in Europe and also, the best preserved. The Road passes the old fortifications through Floriańska Gate under a defensive tower. It is the original entrance to the city and the only gate, of the eight city gates built in the Middle Ages, not dismantled during the 19th century modernization of Kraków. Inside the Old Town (Stare Miasto), the Road continues along Floriańska Street and enters the Main Square (Rynek Główny), the largest medieval market square in Europe. On the left-hand side, at the northeast corner of the square stands St. Mary's Basilica, home of the oldest and the largest Gothic altarpiece in the world. At the center of the plaza, surrounded by row houses (kamienice) and noble residences, stands the Renaissance cloth hall Sukiennice flanked by the Town Hall Tower (Wieża ratuszowa).

The Road passes the Romanesque Church of St. Wojciech in the south-eastern corner of the square, and leads down Grodzka Street along a number of historic landmarks and two smaller squares featured on both sides. Grodzka ends at the foot of the Wawel Hill; with the Wawel architectural complex spread above, featuring Wawel Castle with an armoury, and the Cathedral.

== Landmarks of the Royal Road ==
Some of the most revered as well as the lesser known points of interest and historic landmarks of the city stand on the path of the Royal Road. A more complete list of them would also include the following: Battle of Grunwald Monument at the centre of pl. Matejki, next to the Academy of Fine Arts, right across from Barbakan at Basztowa Street; Arsenal of the Czartoryski Museum on Pijarska Street adjacent to Florian Gate at the foot of Floriańska Street; the Matejko Manor division of the National Museum as well as the Jagiellonian University Museum of Pharmacy on Floriańska; and the Hipolit House division of the Historical Museum of Kraków across from St. Mary's Basilica (including a smaller Church of St Barbara), at the entrance to Main Market Square.

On the east side of Sukiennice Cloth Hall with the free-standing Town Hall Tower protruding from behind, there is the Adam Mickiewicz Monument, one of the best known bronze monuments in Poland. At the beginning of Grodzka: the Church of St. Wojciech (St Adalbert's) and not far behind, the All Saints Square (pl. Wszystkich Świętych) with Wielopolski Palace (the seat of Kraków's mayor) and the Church of St. Francis of Assisi on its west side with Shroud of Turin exact replica. Just three small city blocks down Grodzka, there's the St. Mary Magdalene Square with the Church of Saints Peter and Paul (first Baroque church in Poland) and the Church of St. Andrew; and, at the end of Grodzka (one block further), the Church of St. Giles at Podzamcze Street. The Royal Road opens up to Wawel Hill towering from above, with the Wawel Castle and the Wawel Cathedral accessible by two ascending roads, the east and the west side entrances.

== Photo tour ==
Royal Road, southbound, from Kleparz into Floriańska Street (left to right)
St Florian's Church	Barbakan	Florian Gate	Floriańska Street

Royal Road (continued), southbound, from Main Square down Grodzka Street (left to right)
St. Mary's; Basilica	Kraków's Main Square (2005 during John Paul II celebrations)	St Adalbert's; Church	Franciscan's, at All Saints Square	Wielopolski; Palace

Royal Road, southbound, along Grodzka Street to Wawel (left to right)
Church of Saints Peter and Paul	St Andrew's; Church	Royal Wawel Castle on Wawel Hill	Wawel Cathedral at Wawel
