= Markowicowska Tenement House =

Markowicowska Tenement
- Kamienica Markowicowska
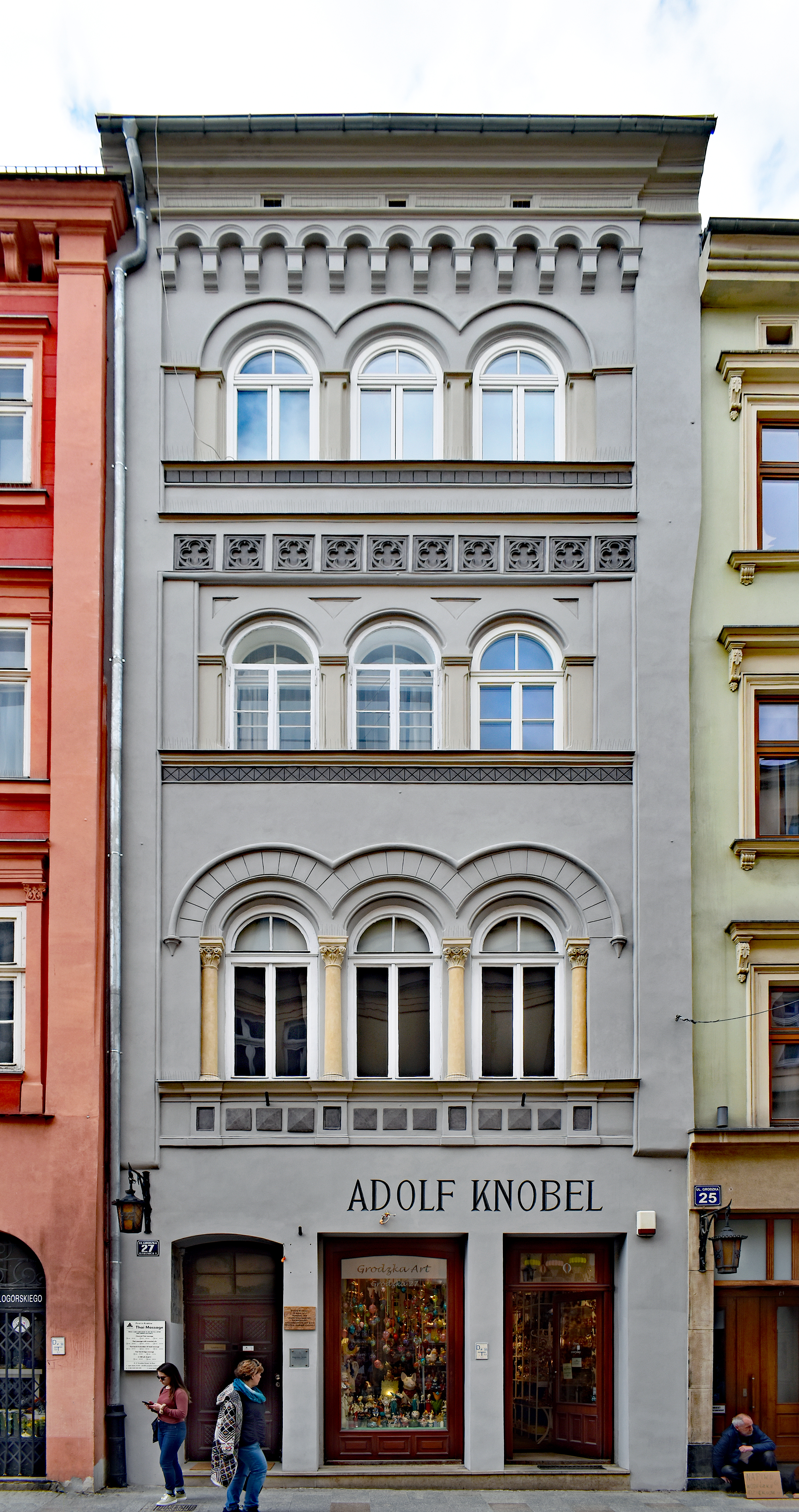

General information
- Location: 27 Grodzka Street, Kraków, Poland
- Coordinates: 50°03′30.95″N 19°56′15.82″E
- Completed: 14th century

Markowicowska Tenement House (Polish: Kamienica Markowicowska) is a tenement located at 27 Grodzka Street in Kraków in the District I Old Town.

== History ==
The tenement house was built around 1370. Its first owner was Gotfridus Gallicus. In the 15th century, it was rebuilt. In 1695, the name "Markowicowska Tenement" appeared in sources for the first time. In the 18th century, the house was reconstructed at the request of the Michałowski family. The tenement burned down during the fire of Kraków in 1850. It was rebuilt in 1860 in the round-arch style, known as Rundbogenstil, inspired by early Christian and Byzantine architecture. The reconstruction design was created by architect Antoni Sacharski, and the investor was merchant Stanisław Armatys. Since 1910, the building has been municipal property.

On April 28, 1967, the tenement was entered into the Registry of Cultural Property. It is also entered into the municipal register of monuments of the Lesser Poland Voivodeship.
