= Wojnarowicowska Tenement House =

Wojnarowicowska Tenement
- Kamienica Wojnarowicowska
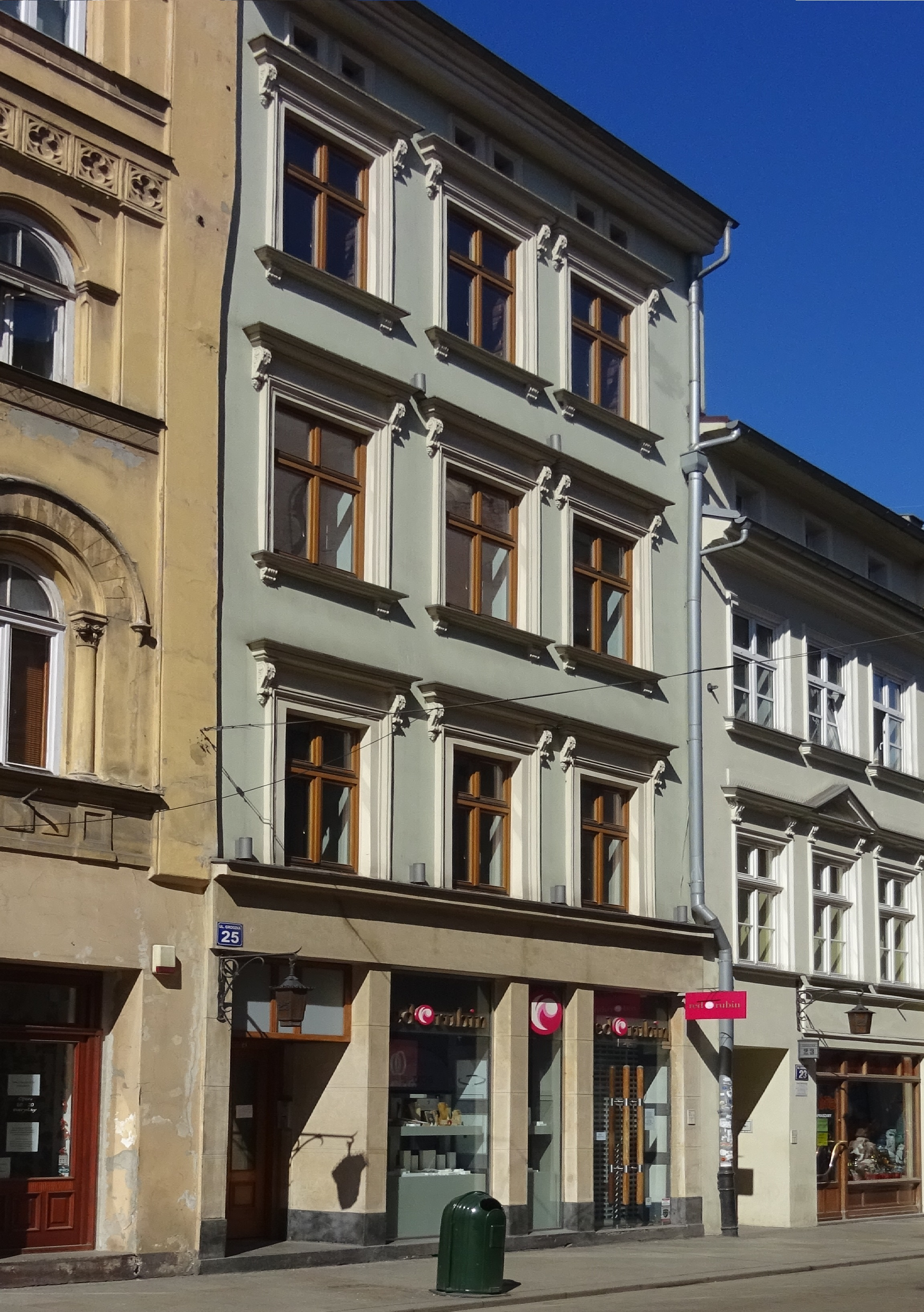

General information
- Address: 25 Grodzka Street
- Town or city: Kraków
- Country: Poland
- Coordinates: 50°03′31.1″N 19°56′15.8″E
- Completed: 14th century

Wojnarowicowska Tenement House (Polish: Kamienica Wojnarowicowska) is a historical tenement house located at 25 Grodzka Street in the Old Town of Kraków, Poland.

== History ==
The tenement house was built in the mid-14th century. Its first owner was Heynco Srielle. In the 16th century, it was rebuilt. In 1647, the name Kamienica Wojnarowicowska (Wojnarowicowska Tenement) appeared in historical records for the first time, derived from the surname of its then-owner. In 1825, the house was purchased by Antoni Kieres, who commissioned its reconstruction in 1831 and 1841. The tenement burned down during the Kraków Fire of 1850 but was rebuilt the same year. Since 1910, it has been municipal property.

On March 10, 1966, the tenement was entered into the Registry of Cultural Property. It is also entered into the municipal register of monuments of the Lesser Poland Voivodeship.
