= Szarffenberg Tenement =

Szarffenbergów Tenement
- Kamienica Szarffenbergów
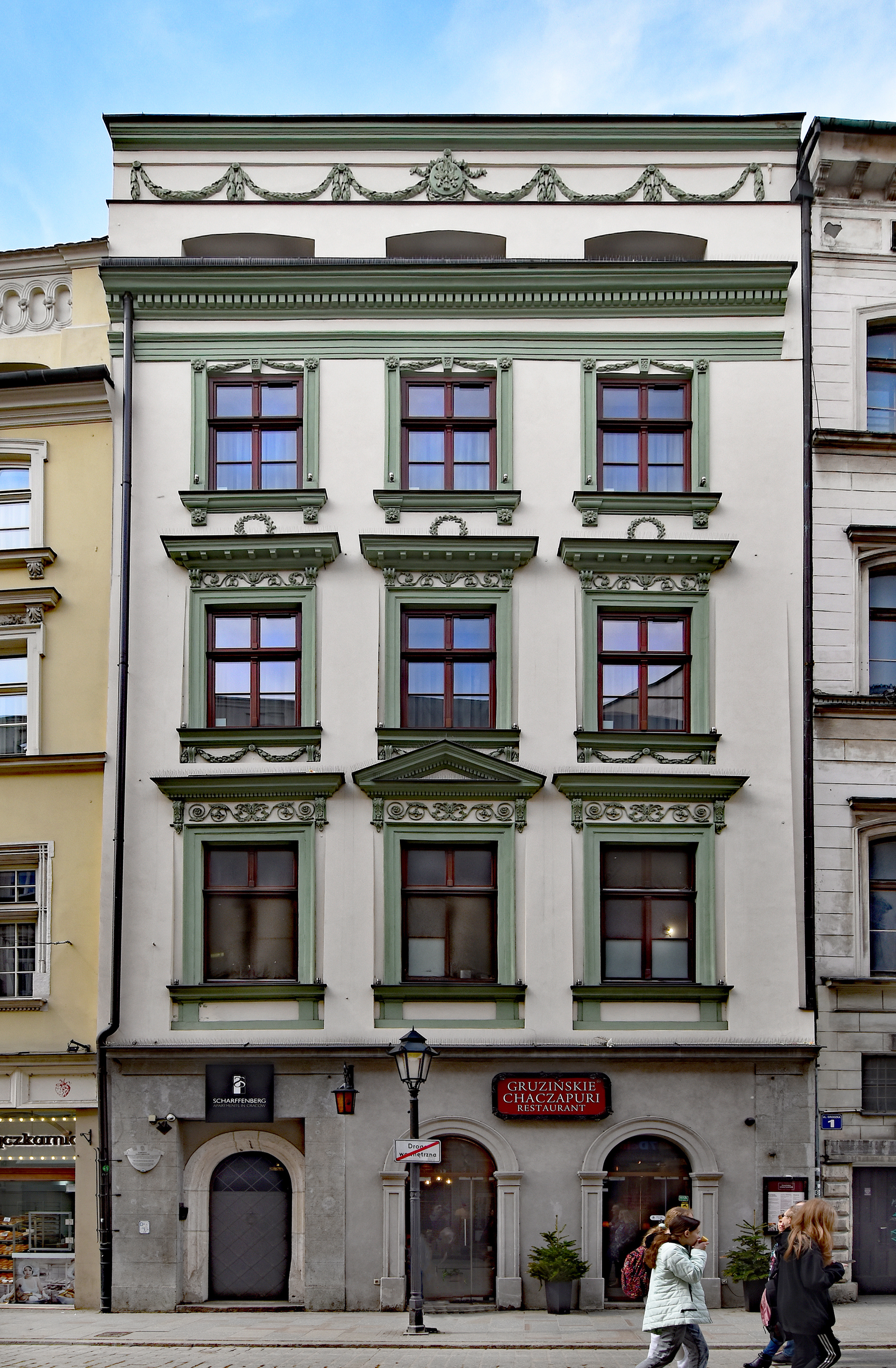

General information
- Address: 3 Grodzka Street
- Town or city: Kraków
- Country: Poland
- Coordinates: 50°03′36.1″N 19°56′15.0″E
- Completed: 14th century

Szarffenbergów Tenement House (Polish: Kamienica Szarffenbergów) is a tenement located at 3 Grodzka Street in Kraków in the District I Old Town.

== History ==
The tenement house was built in the 14th century. At the turn of the 15th and 16th centuries, it was rebuilt. In 1570, it was purchased by Mikołaj Szarffenberg, who established a printing house there. Based on a privilege granted by King Sigismund II Augustus, it had the exclusive right to print statutes, parliamentary constitutions, royal charters, and other official documents. In 1606, the building and the printing workshop passed into the hands of Mikołaj's son, Jan. In 1623, the tenement was acquired by Stanisław Germański, who ran not only the printing house but also a bookstore there. The house burned down during the Kraków Fire of 1850 but was soon rebuilt. The late-Classical façade dates from this period. In 2015, the tenement underwent conservation renovations.

On March 9, 1966, the tenement was entered into the Registry of Cultural Property. It is also entered into the municipal register of monuments of the Lesser Poland Voivodeship.
