= Swiechowicz Tenement =

Swiechowiczowska Tenement
- Kamienica Swiechowiczowska
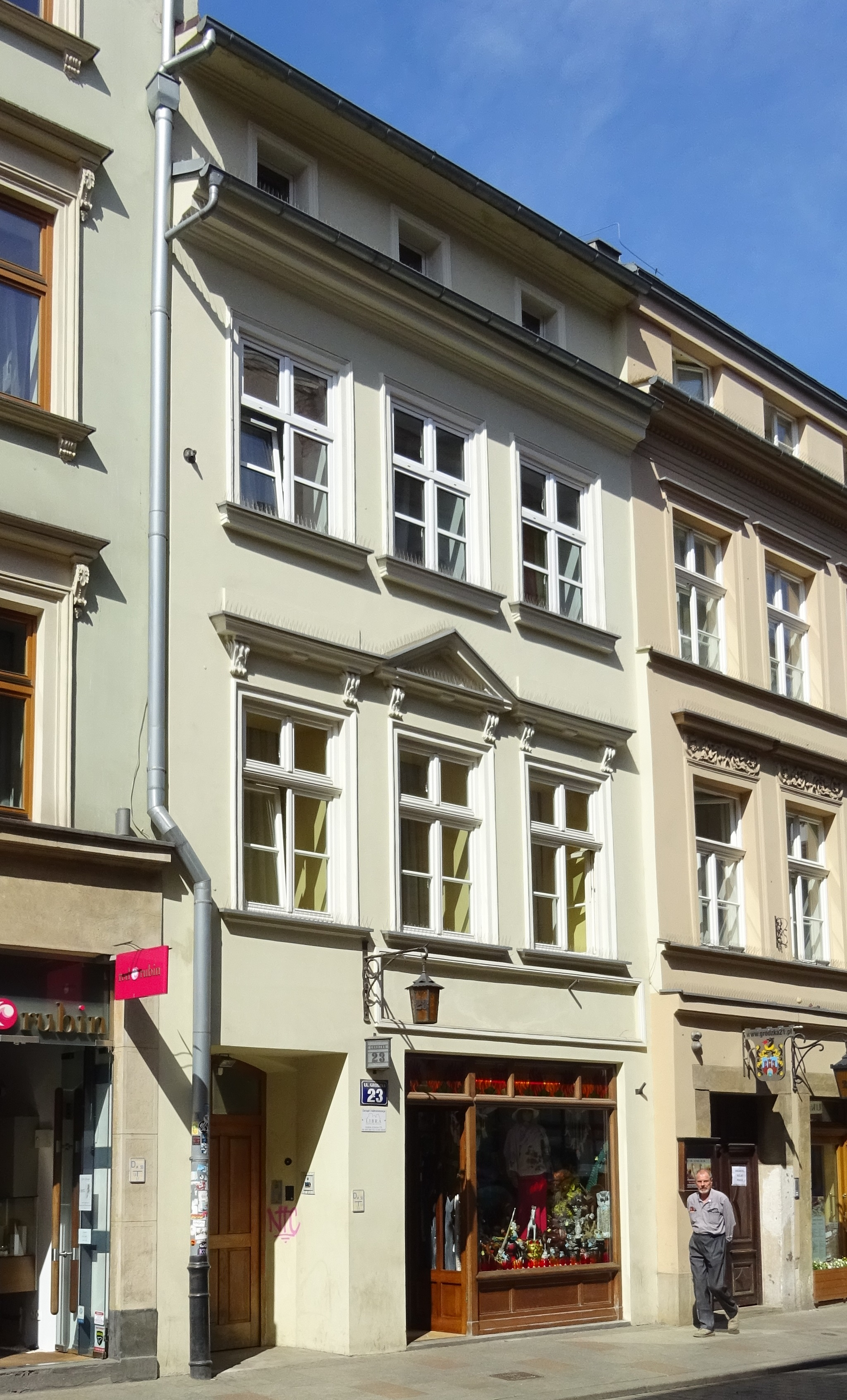

General information
- Address: 23 Grodzka Street
- Town or city: Kraków
- Country: Poland
- Coordinates: 50°03′31.39″N 19°56′15.93″E
- Completed: 14th century

Swiechowiczowska Tenement House (Polish: Kamienica Swiechowiczowska) is a tenement located at 23 Grodzka Street in Kraków in the District I Old Town.

== History ==
The tenement house was built in the mid-14th century. Its first owner was Gyslone of Opava. In the 15th century, it was rebuilt. In 1653, the name Kamienica Świechowiczowska appeared for the first time in historical records, derived from the surname of its then-owner. Between 1768 and 1770, the house was reconstructed at the request of the Lewicki family. The tenement burned down during the fire of Kraków in 1850 and was rebuilt in 1851. The last renovation took place at the beginning of the 20th century. Since 1910, the building has been municipal property.

On March 10, 1966, the tenement was entered into the Registry of Cultural Property. It is also entered into the municipal register of monuments of the Lesser Poland Voivodeship.
