= Liber Tenement =

Liberowska Tenement
- Kamienica Liberowska
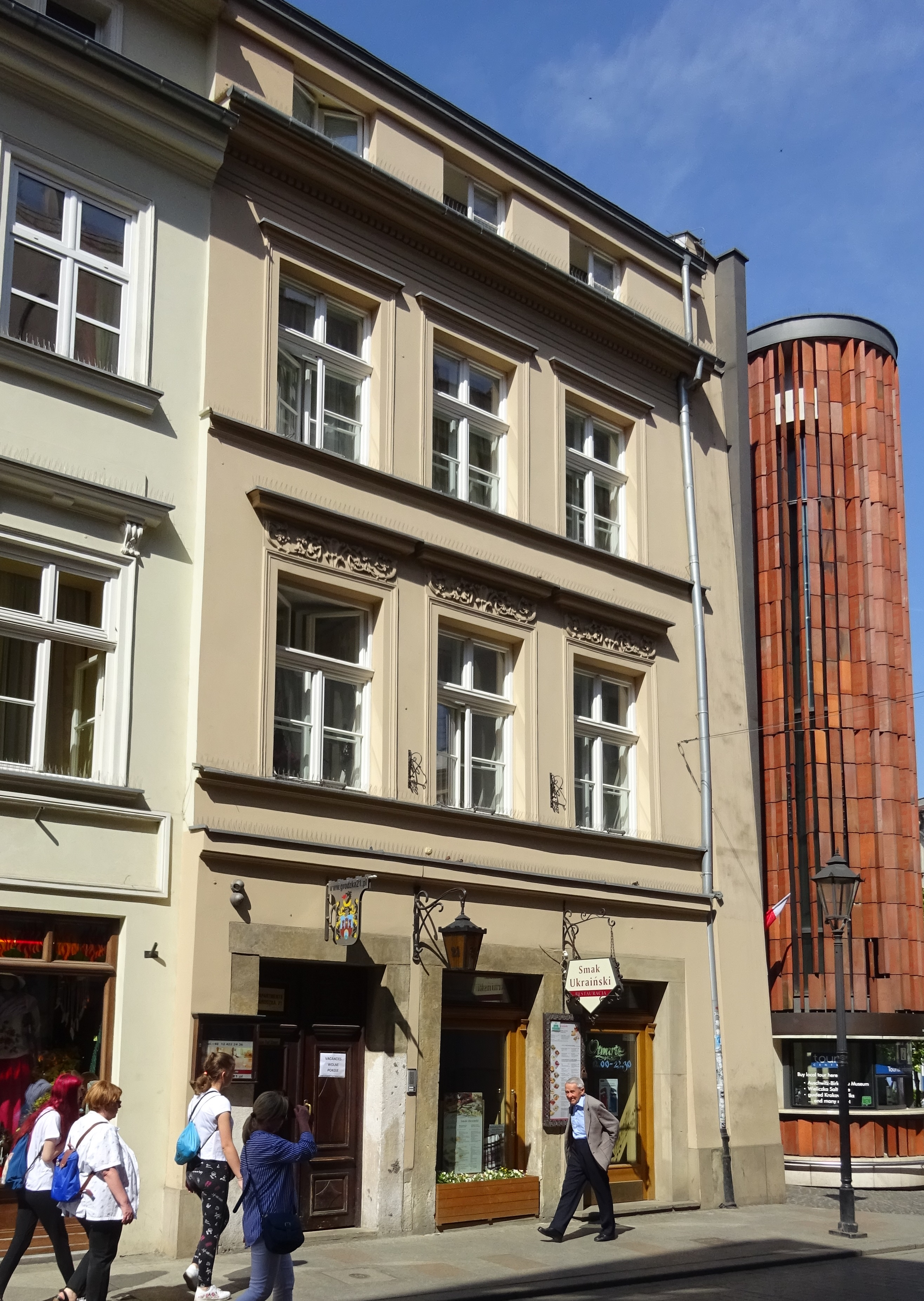

General information
- Address: 21 Grodzka Street
- Town or city: Kraków
- Country: Poland
- Coordinates: 50°03′31.56″N 19°56′15.82″E
- Completed: 14th century

Liberowska Tenement House (Polish: Kamienica Liberowska) is a tenement located at 21 Grodzka Street in Kraków in the District I Old Town.

== History ==
The tenement house was built in the second half of the 14th century by Martin Plathenger. In the 15th century, it was rebuilt. In the 17th century, the house was owned by the Liber family for nearly 20 years, from which its name originates, first recorded in 1642. The tenement burned down during the fire of Kraków in 1850 but was soon rebuilt. In 1914, the building became municipal property. At the end of the 20th century, it returned to private ownership. Currently, it houses an aparthotel.

On March 10, 1966, the tenement was entered into the Registry of Cultural Property. It is also entered into the municipal register of monuments of the Lesser Poland Voivodeship.
