= Celestyńska Tenement House =

Tenement house in Kraków Old Town, Poland

- Kamienica Celestyńska
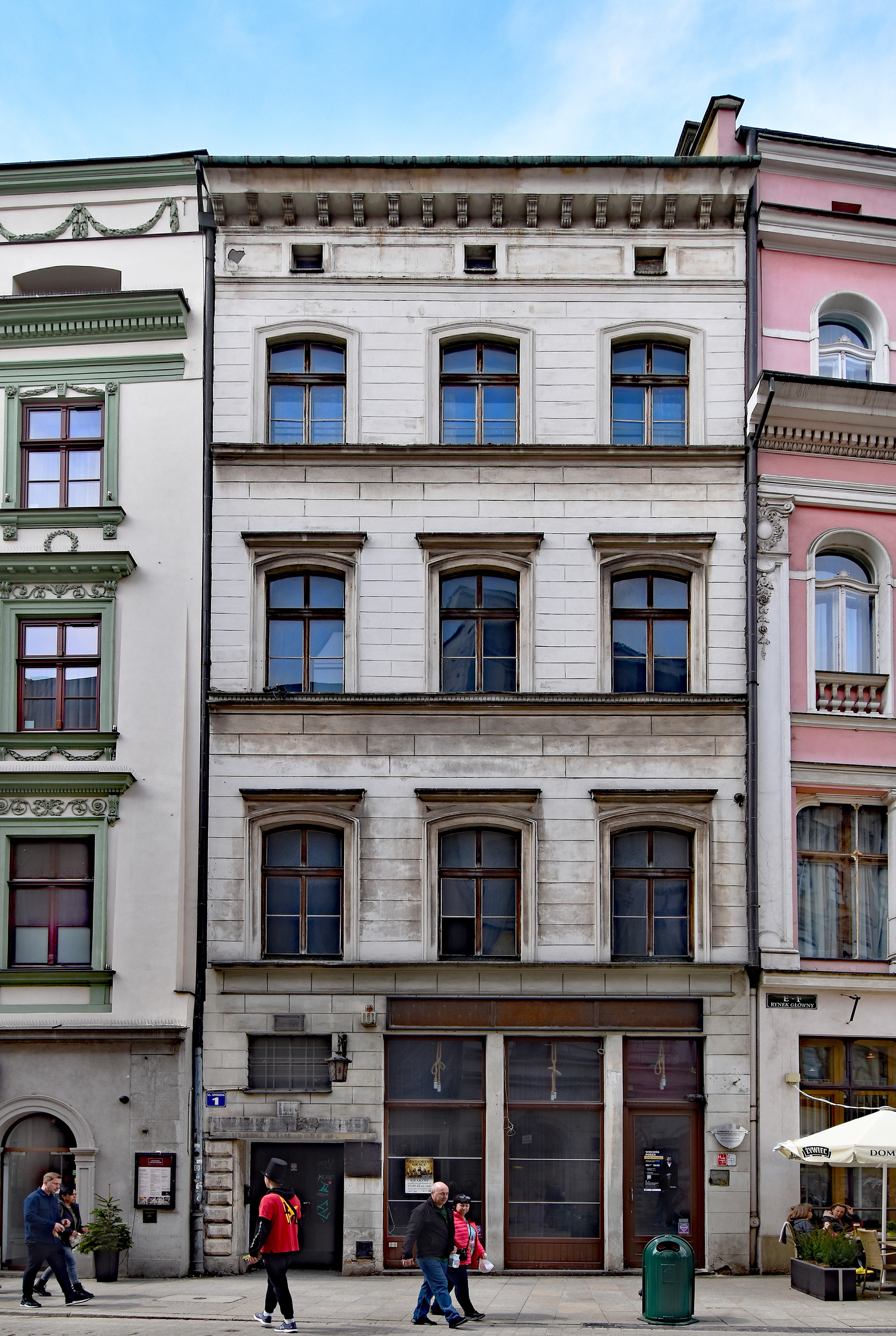
- Interactive map of the Celestyńska Tenement House area

General information
- Location: 1 Grodzka Street, Kraków, Poland
- Coordinates: 50°03′36.4″N 19°56′14.9″E
- Completed: 15th century

Celestyńska Tenement House (Polish: Kamienica Celestyńska) is a historic tenement house located at 1 Grodzka Street in the Old Town of Kraków, Poland.

== History ==
The tenement house was built in the 15th century. At the beginning of the 17th century, it was rebuilt. Between 1624 and 1660, its owner was Jakub Celesta, a merchant trading in lead, copper, and herring. From this period comes a plaque in the form of a strip bearing Jakub’s initials—I.C.R.K. (Iacobus Celestus Rajca Krakowski) and the Celesta family coat of arms with the date 1646 on the entrance portal. The tenement house burned down during the Kraków Fire of 1850. Two years later, it was rebuilt. In 1885, the house was purchased by Stanisław Wolf, on whose orders it was thoroughly reconstructed between 1906 and 1907. After World War II, a café called "Lilia" operated in the tenement’s courtyard, serving as a meeting place for writers and satirists.

On April 28, 1967, the tenement was entered into the Registry of Cultural Property. It is also entered into the municipal register of monuments of the Lesser Poland Voivodeship.
