= Stolarska Street, Kraków =

Street in Kraków, Poland

Stolarska Street
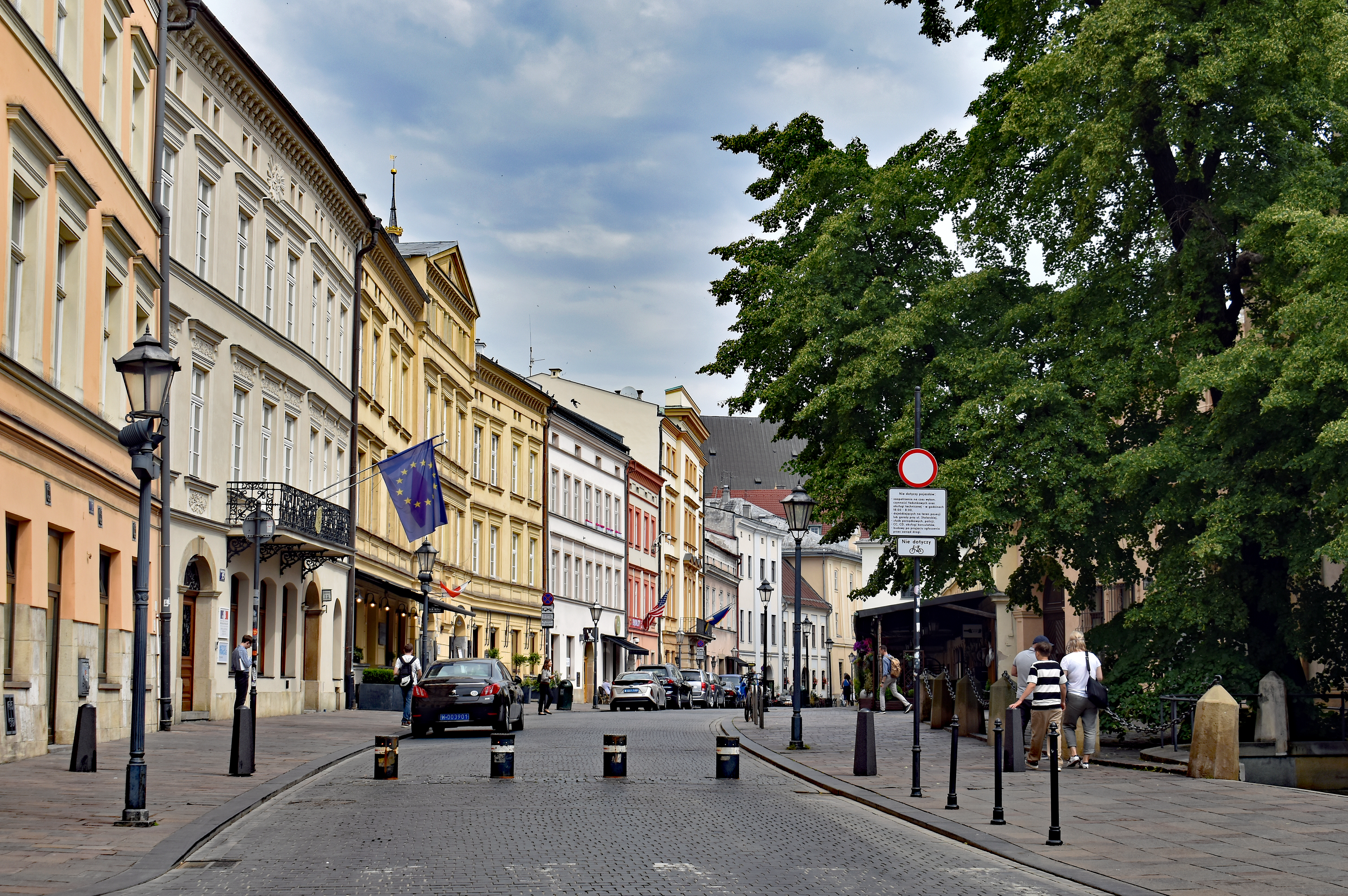
- View towards the north from Dominican Square

- Length: 200 m (660 ft)
- North end: Mały Rynek
- South end: Dominikańska Street

UNESCO World Heritage Site
- Type: Cultural
- Criteria: iv
- Designated: 1978
- Part of: Historic Centre of Kraków
- Reference no.: 29
- Region: Europe and North America

Historic Monument of Poland
- Designated: 1994-09-08
- Part of: Kraków historical city complex
- Reference no.: M.P. 1994 nr 50 poz. 418

Stolarska Street (Polish: Ulica Stolarska, lit. Carpenters Street) - a historic street in Kraków, Poland. The street extends southwards from Mały Rynek to Dominikańska Street (Ulica Dominikańska). The oldest recorded name of the street is platea fratrum Praedicatorum (relating to the existence of the Holy Trinity Basilica at the southern point of the street), from 1305. The present name was first recorded in 1542. The curve in the street is a result of a dwelling prior to Kraków receiving its city rights in 1257 laying in its transcent.

The street features the consulates of France, Germany and the United States of America.

The street is part of the Lesser Polish Way of Saint James from Sandomierz to Tyniec.

== Features ==
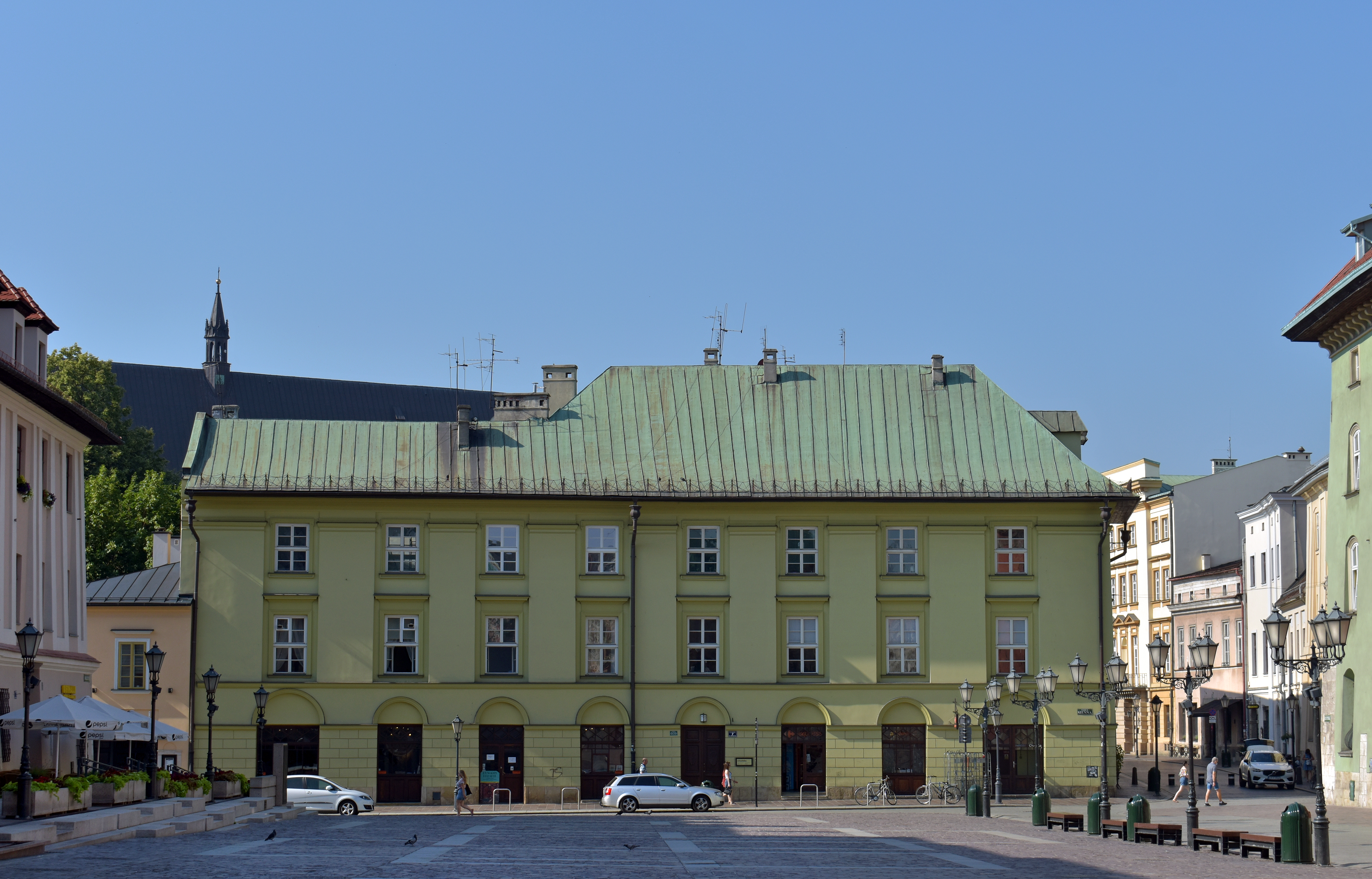
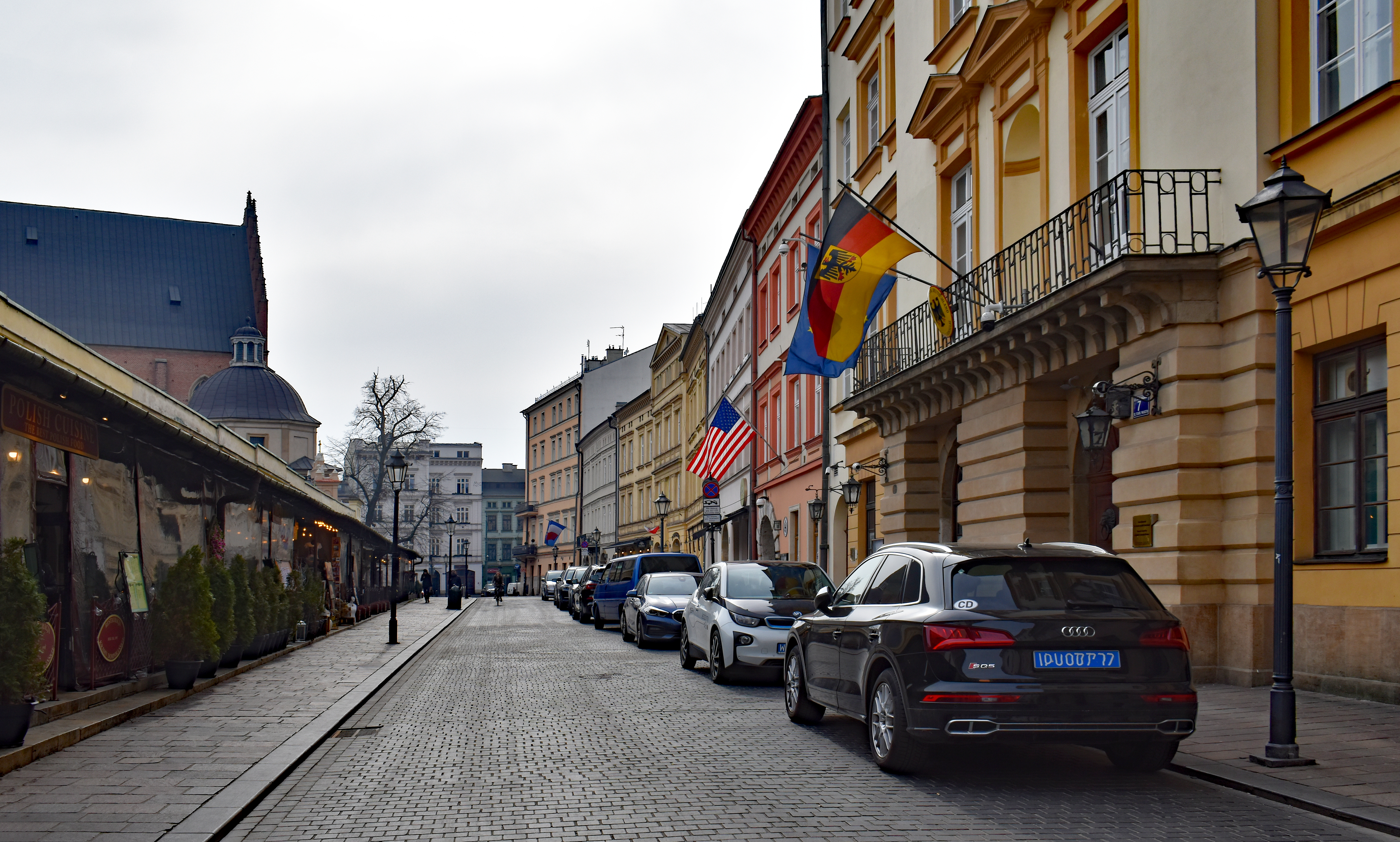
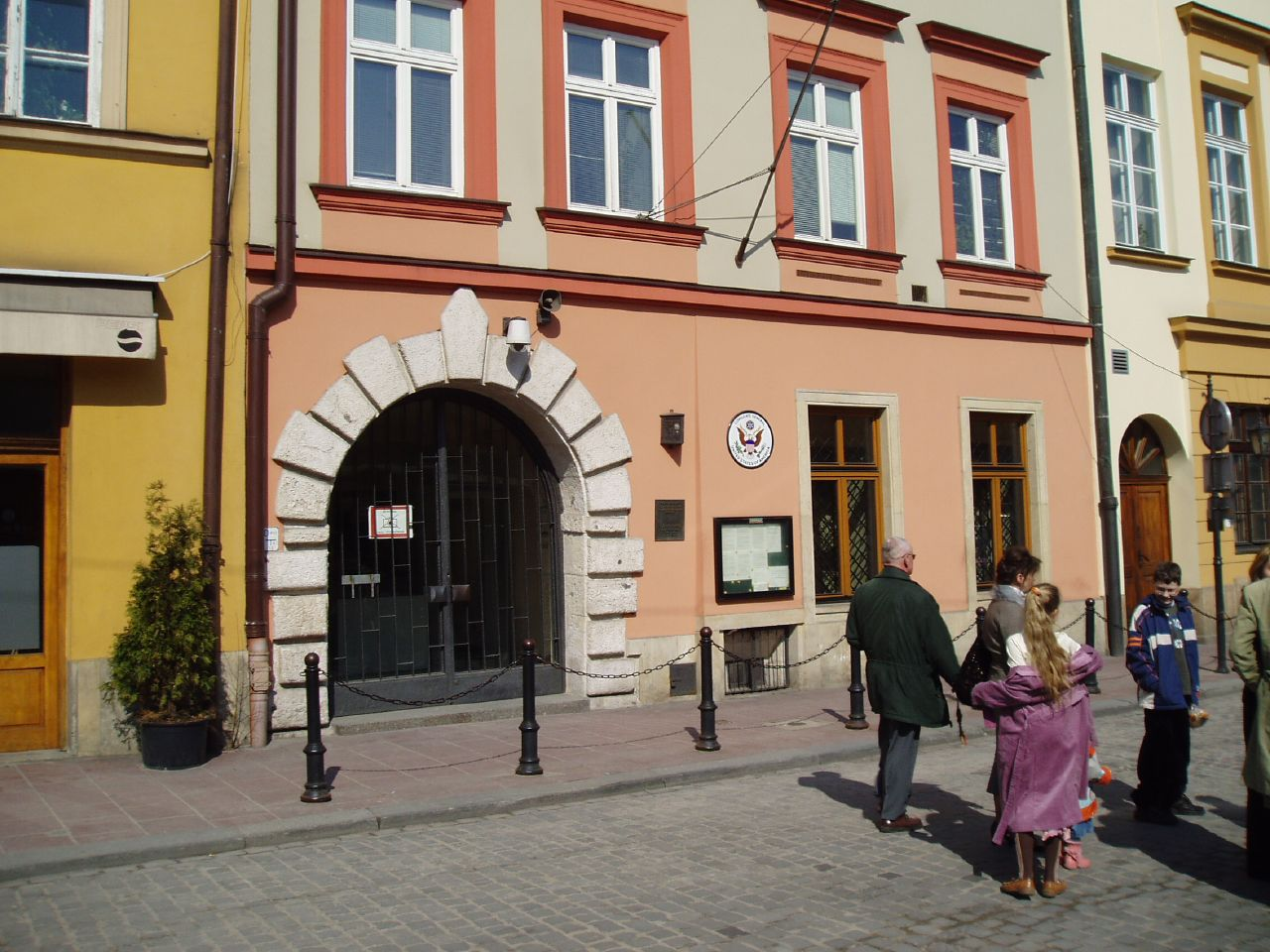
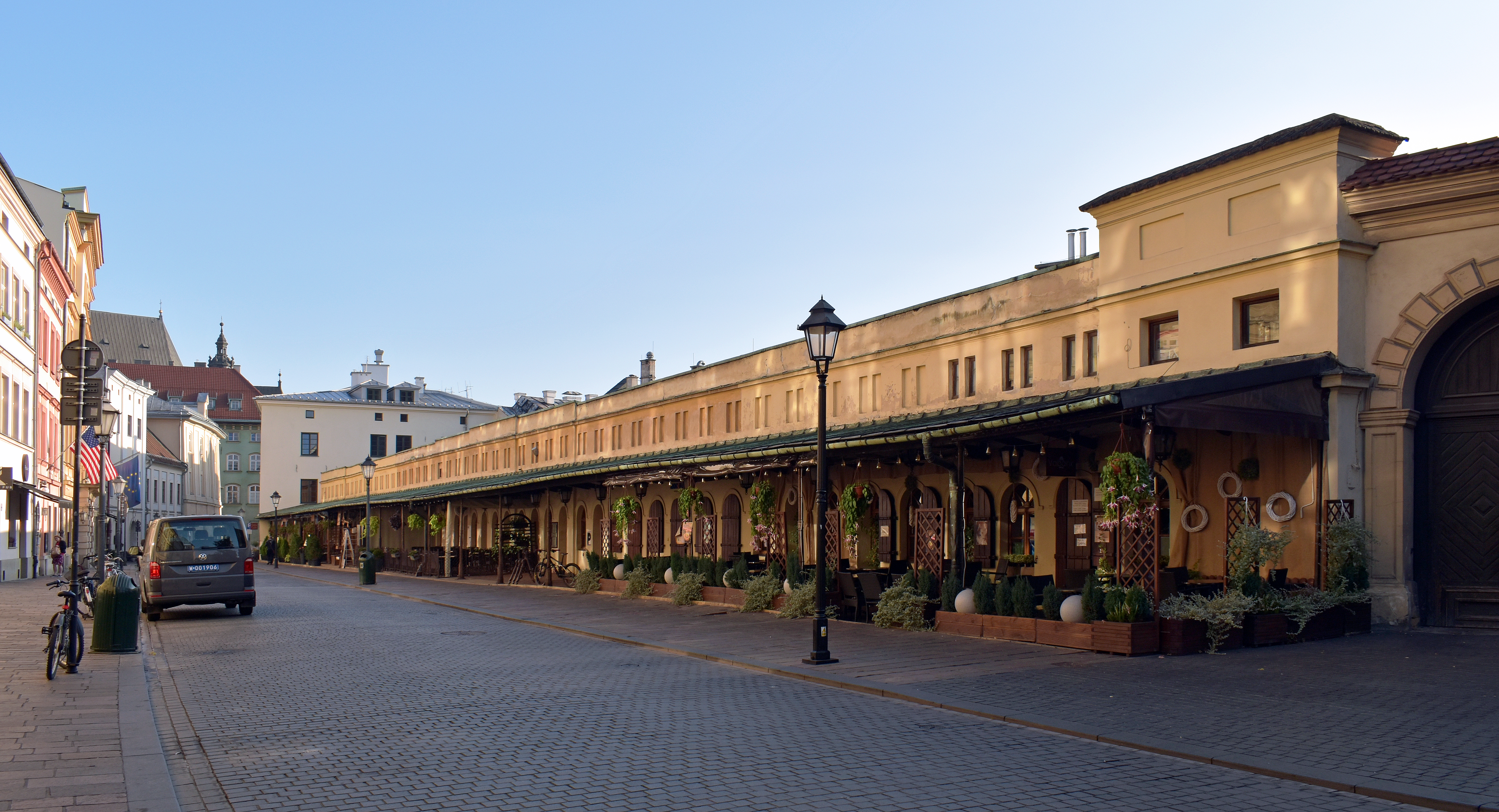
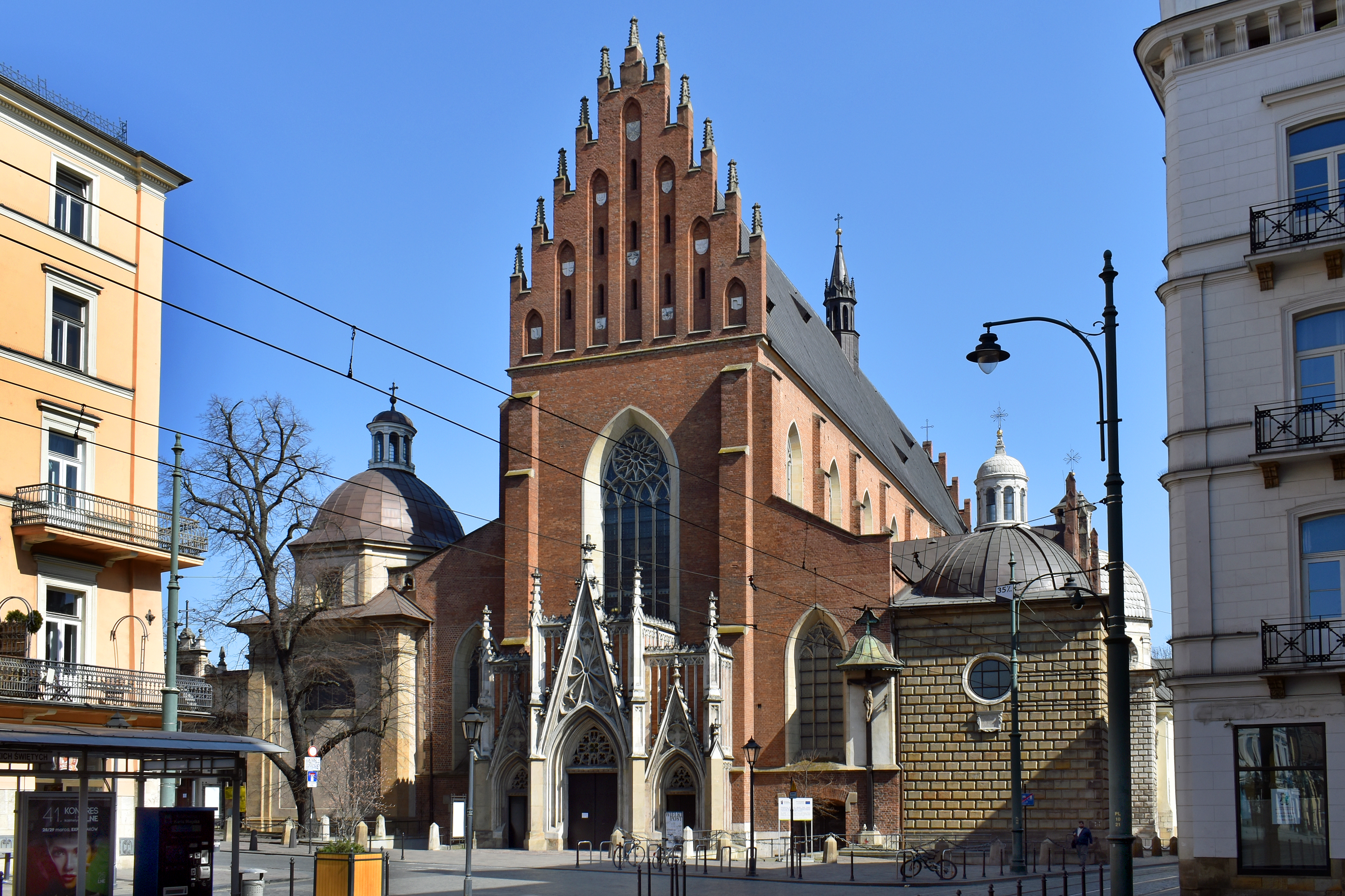
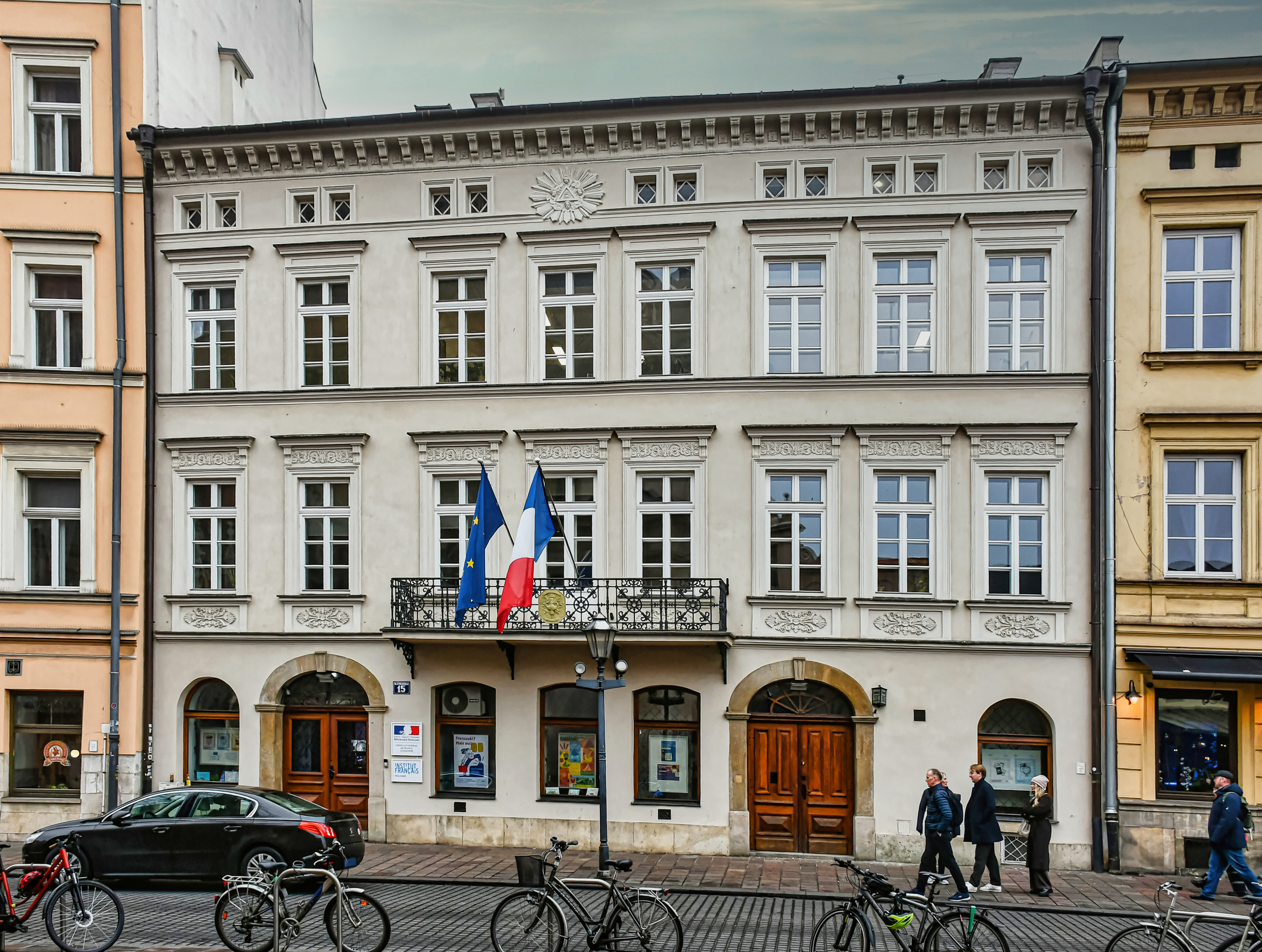
Street No.	Short description	Picture
2	Gutkowski House - built between 1851 and 1861. The building's bricks come from a former structure that stood in its place prior to the Great Fire of Kraków in 1850. Presently, the building features Classicist architectural features.
5	Pasaż Bielaka - Passage between Stolarska Street and the tenement house 9 Main Market Square.
7	General Consulate of the Federal Republic of Germany (Konsulat Generalny Republiki Federalnej Niemiec - formerly Morsztynów Palace. The building was built in the Empire architectural style.
9	General Consulate of the United States (Konsulat Generalny Stanów Zjednoczonych).
8-10	Kramy Dominikańskie (lit. Dominican Stalls) - built in 1861 after the Great Fire of Kraków in 1850, in the location of a former Dominican Pharmacy. The stalls were formerly under the ownership of the Dominican Order. Presently, they house several retailers.
12	Church of the Holy Trinity
15	Under Providence tenement house (Kamienica pod Opatrznością - housing the General Consulate of France and the French Institute in Kraków.
