= Stolarski =

Stolarski (feminine Stolarska) is a Polish occupational surname equivalent to English Carpenter. Notable people include:

- Błażej Stolarski (1880–1939), Polish politician, Deputy Marshal of the Polish Senate
- Marcin Stolarski (born 1996), Polish swimmer
- Mateusz Stolarski (born 1993), Polish football manager
- Paweł Stolarski (born 1996), Polish footballer
- Richard Stolarski (1941–2024), American atmospheric scientist
- Zdzisław Stolarski (born 1948), Polish wrestler

== See also ==
- Stolarska Street, Kraków, Carpenter's Street in Kraków
