= 50 Grodzka Street tenement =

Historic tenement house in Kraków Old Town, Poland

50 Grodzka Tenement
- Kamienica przy ulicy Grodzkiej 50
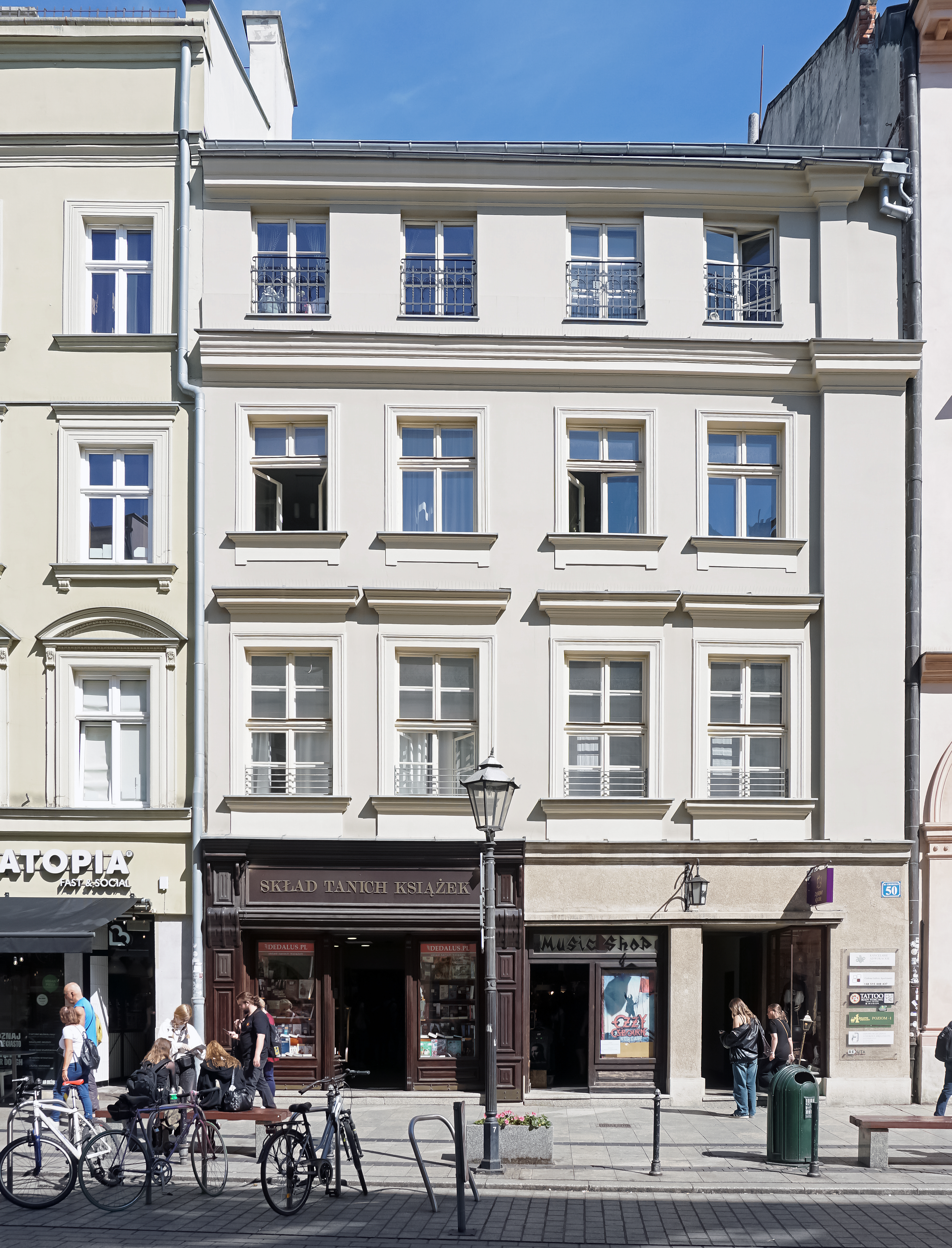

General information
- Location: 50 Grodzka Street, Kraków, Poland
- Coordinates: 50°03′26.9″N 19°56′18.4″E
- Completed: 14th century–15th century

50 Grodzka Street Tenement House (Polish: Kamienica przy ulicy Grodzkiej 50) is a historic tenement house located at 50 Grodzka Street in the Old Town of Kraków, Poland.

== History ==
The tenement house was constructed at the turn of the 14th and 15th centuries. Between the late 16th and early 17th centuries, it was rebuilt by an unnamed member of the Lernicki family. In 1747, the building became property of the Jesuits. It returned to private hands in 1780 when it was purchased by Jan Chrząstowski of Brzezie. In the first half of the 19th century, the tenement was remodeled by Mateusz Szontke. The final reconstruction took place at the turn of the 20th century.

On May 2, 1967, the tenement was entered into the Registry of Cultural Property. It is also entered into the municipal register of monuments of the Lesser Poland Voivodeship.
