= Marian Penitentiaries Tenement =

- Kamienica Penitencjarzy Mariackich
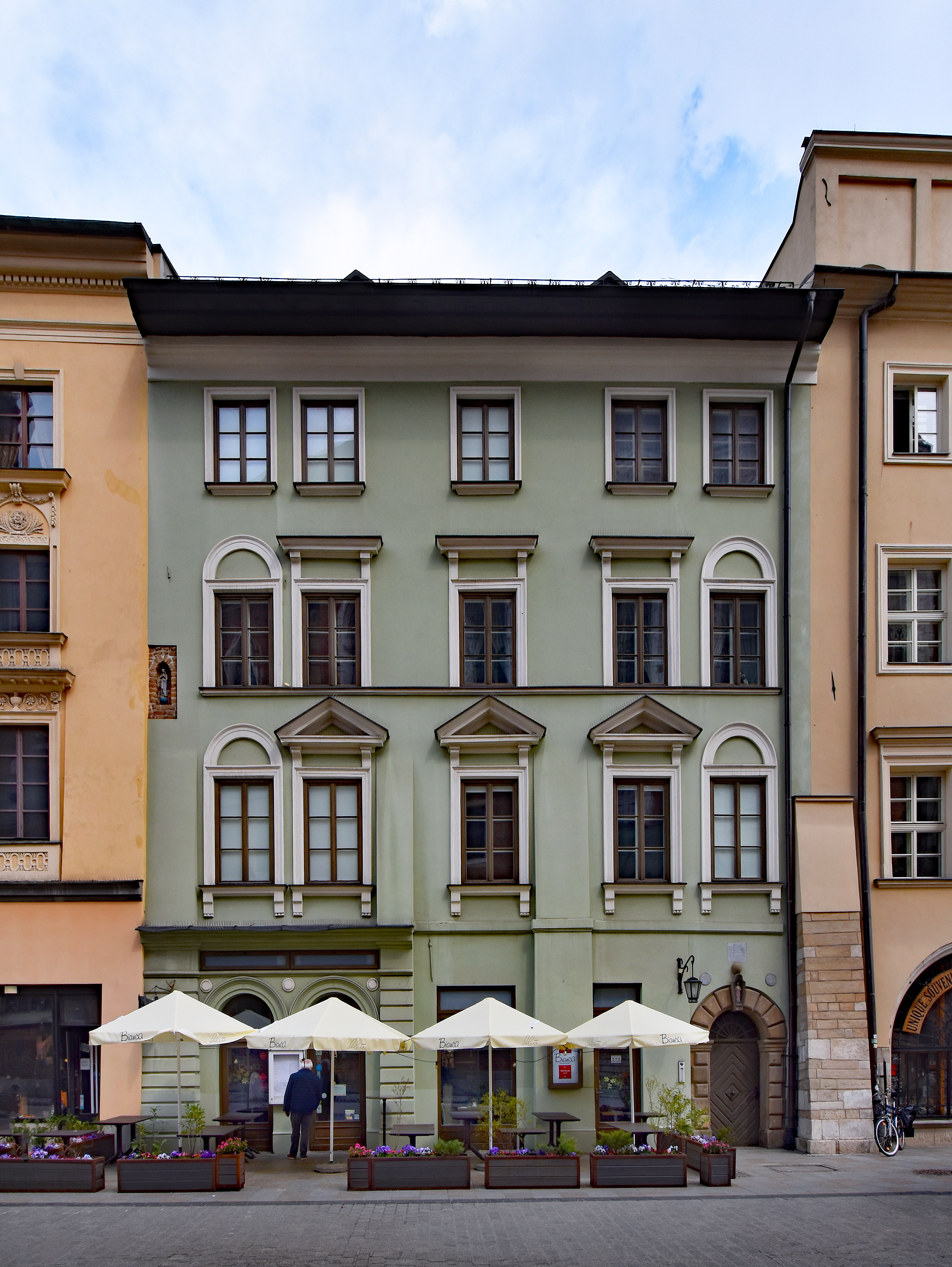
- Interactive map of the Marian Penitentiaries Tenement area

General information
- Location: 2 Mary Square, Kraków, Poland
- Coordinates: 50°03′43.02″N 19°56′23.64″E

The Marian Penitentiaries Tenement (Polish: Kamienica Penitencjarzy Mariackich) is a tenement house in Kraków, Poland, located at 2 Mary Square within the Old Town neighbourhood. It was built in the 14th century

== History ==
The tenement house was built in the 14th century. Initially, it was secular property. In 1637, Bazyli and Zuzanna Ryniewicz sold the building to the Parish of the Assumption of the Blessed Virgin Mary, which housed penitentiary priests there. In the second half of the 18th century, it was rebuilt in the Baroque style. In the mid-19th century, the tenement was remodeled in the Classicist style and extended with a third floor.

In 2009, during conservation work, Gothic and Baroque ceilings with polychromes and wall hangings were discovered.

On March 21, 1968, the tenement was entered into the Registry of Cultural Property. It is also entered into the municipal register of monuments of the Lesser Poland Voivodeship.

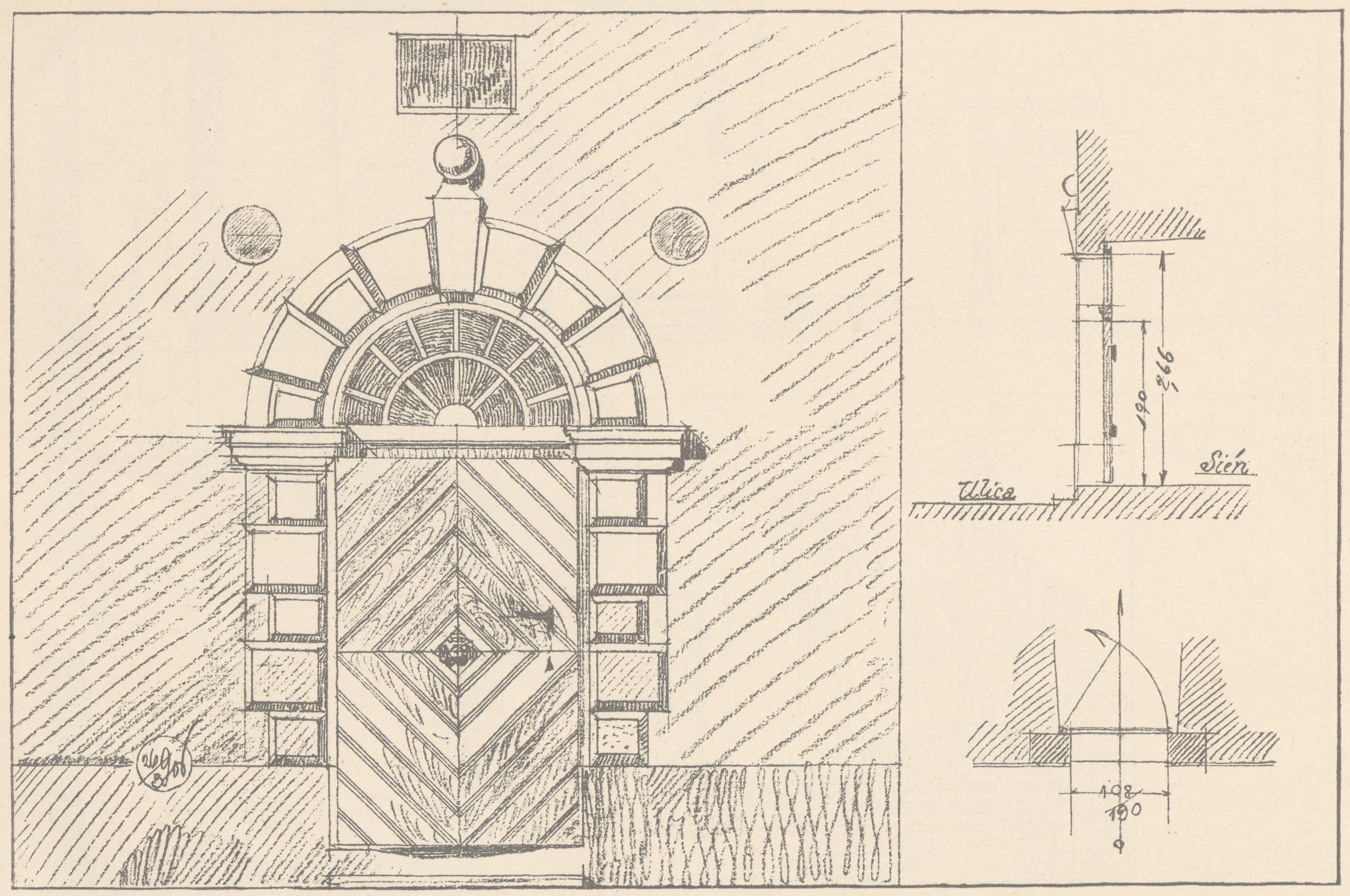
Tenement house portal in a drawing from 1908.
