= Grodzka Street =

Grodzka Street may refer to:

- Grodzka Street, Bydgoszcz
- Grodzka Street, Kraków
