= Salomon Tenement =

Salomońska Tenement
- Kamienica Salomońska
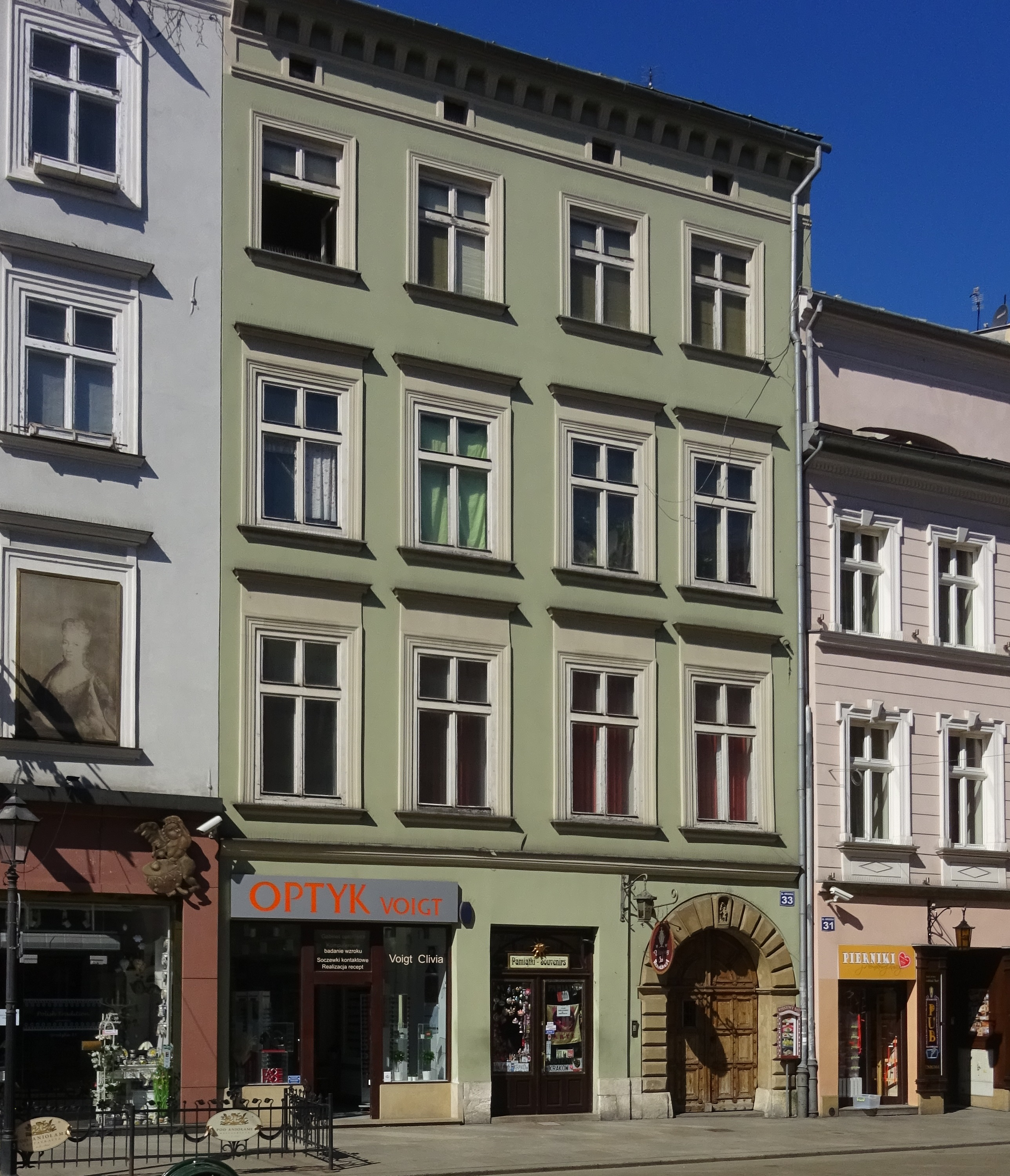

General information
- Address: 33 Grodzka Street
- Town or city: Kraków
- Country: Poland
- Coordinates: 50°03′30.15″N 19°56′15″E
- Completed: 14th century

Salomońska Tenement House (Polish: Kamienica Salomońska) is a tenement located at 33 Grodzka Street in Kraków in the District I Old Town.

== History ==
The tenement house was built around 1360 by Janusz Czechoslowicz. The next two owners were Polish merchants, after which, in 1412, it passed into the hands of German townspeople for nearly 150 years. The house was rebuilt in the early 17th century. In 1628, the name Kamienica Salomońska (Salomońska Tenement) appeared in sources for the first time. In 1710, an alternative name was also recorded – Kamienica Długoszowska (Długoszowska Tenement). In the 19th century, the building was thoroughly renovated by the Wątorski family. The last reconstruction took place in 1932.

On March 10, 1966, the tenement was entered into the Registry of Cultural Property. It is also entered into the municipal register of monuments of the Lesser Poland Voivodeship.
