= Church of St. Giles, Kraków =

Roman Catholic church in Krakow, Poland

Church of St. Giles
- Kościół św. Idziego
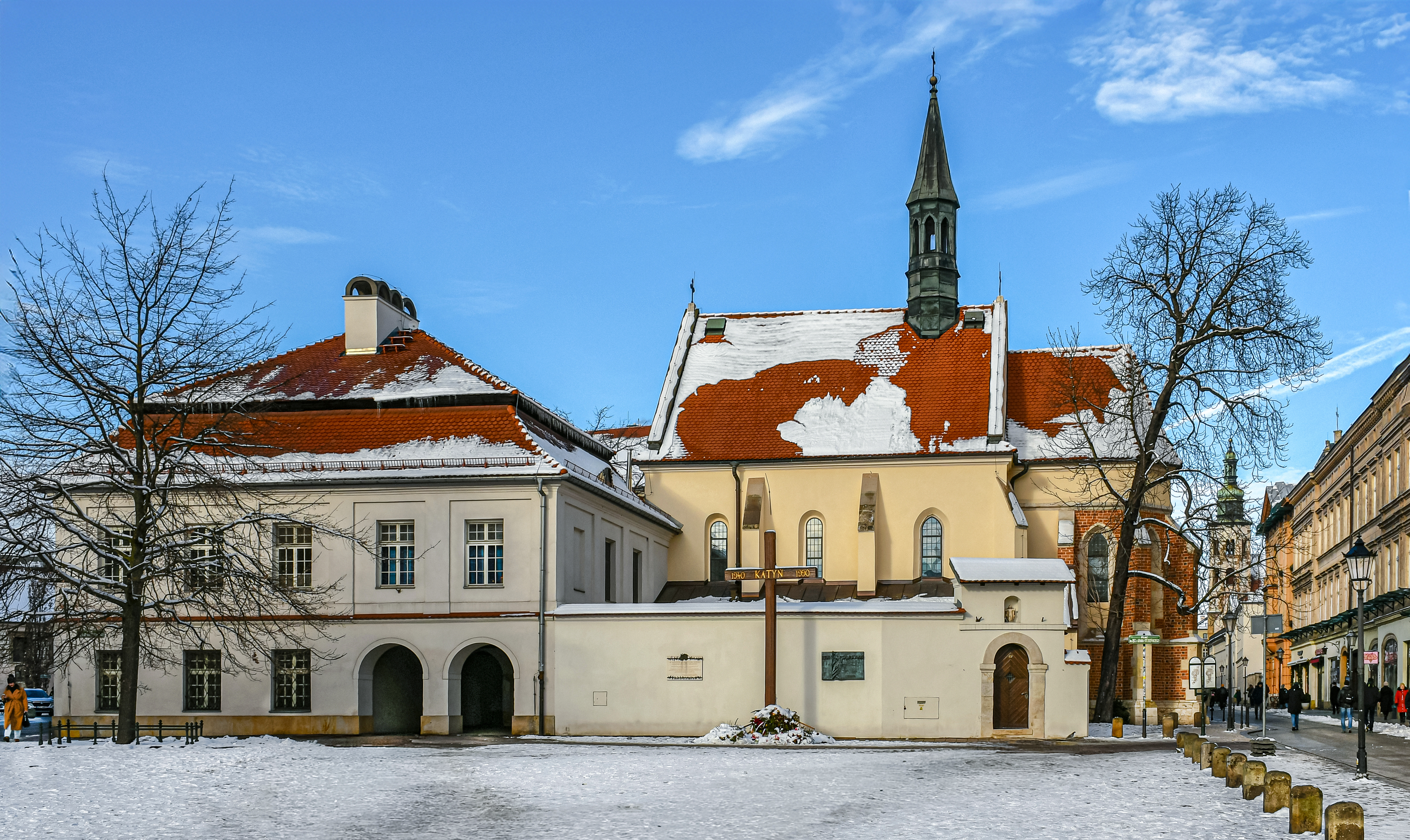
- View from the south
- Church of St. Giles
- 50°03′18.7″N 19°56′17.5″E
- Location: Kraków
- Address: 67 Grodzka Street
- Country: Poland
- Denomination: Roman Catholic

UNESCO World Heritage Site
- Type: Cultural
- Criteria: iv
- Designated: 1978
- Part of: Historic Centre of Kraków
- Reference no.: 29
- Region: Europe and North America

Historic Monument of Poland
- Designated: 1994-09-08
- Part of: Kraków historical city complex
- Reference no.: M.P. 1994 nr 50 poz. 418

Church of St. Giles (Polish: Kościół św. Idziego) is a historic Roman Catholic church of the Dominican Order located on 67 Grodzka Street in the Old Town of Kraków, Poland.

Its history dates to 11th century; it has been rebuilt many times since.

== History ==
The original Church of St. Giles was constructed on the orders of the Duke of Poland, Władysław I Herman in the 11th century. It was done as a result of his wife Judith of Bohemia giving birth to a son, which was attributed to the intercession of Saint Giles. The current church building was reconstructed in the 14th century and later remodelled in 1595 when it was handed over to the Dominican Order. By the start of the 20th century, a number of ancillary buildings had been constructed around the church. In 1905, the Krakow City Council passed an ordinance authorising the demolition of these buildings. This was objected to by heritage groups and Count Mycielski, who allegedly utilised his friendship with Archduke Franz Ferdinand, which resulted in the ordinance being withdrawn but demolitions still occurred leaving only three 18th-century houses. These houses were subsequently demolished by the Nazi General Government during the German occupation of Poland.

In 1990, following the fall of Communism in Poland, a memorial called the Katyń Cross was erected outside the church in memory of the Polish Katyn massacre victims of the Soviet NKVD secret police in 1940, during the Soviet repression of Polish citizens during the Second World War. This is the only Roman Catholic church in Krakow with Mass in English every Sunday.

== Interior ==
Inside the church is an altarpiece painting of St Giles that was formerly considered miraculous and until the early 20th century, was an area where pilgrims would place gifts to commemorate miraculous healing through St Giles' intercession. The choir stalls were originally installed in the Basilica of the Holy Trinity but moved to St Giles' Church in 1629. The altar dates from the early 17th century and a number of mediaeval wood icons are on display.

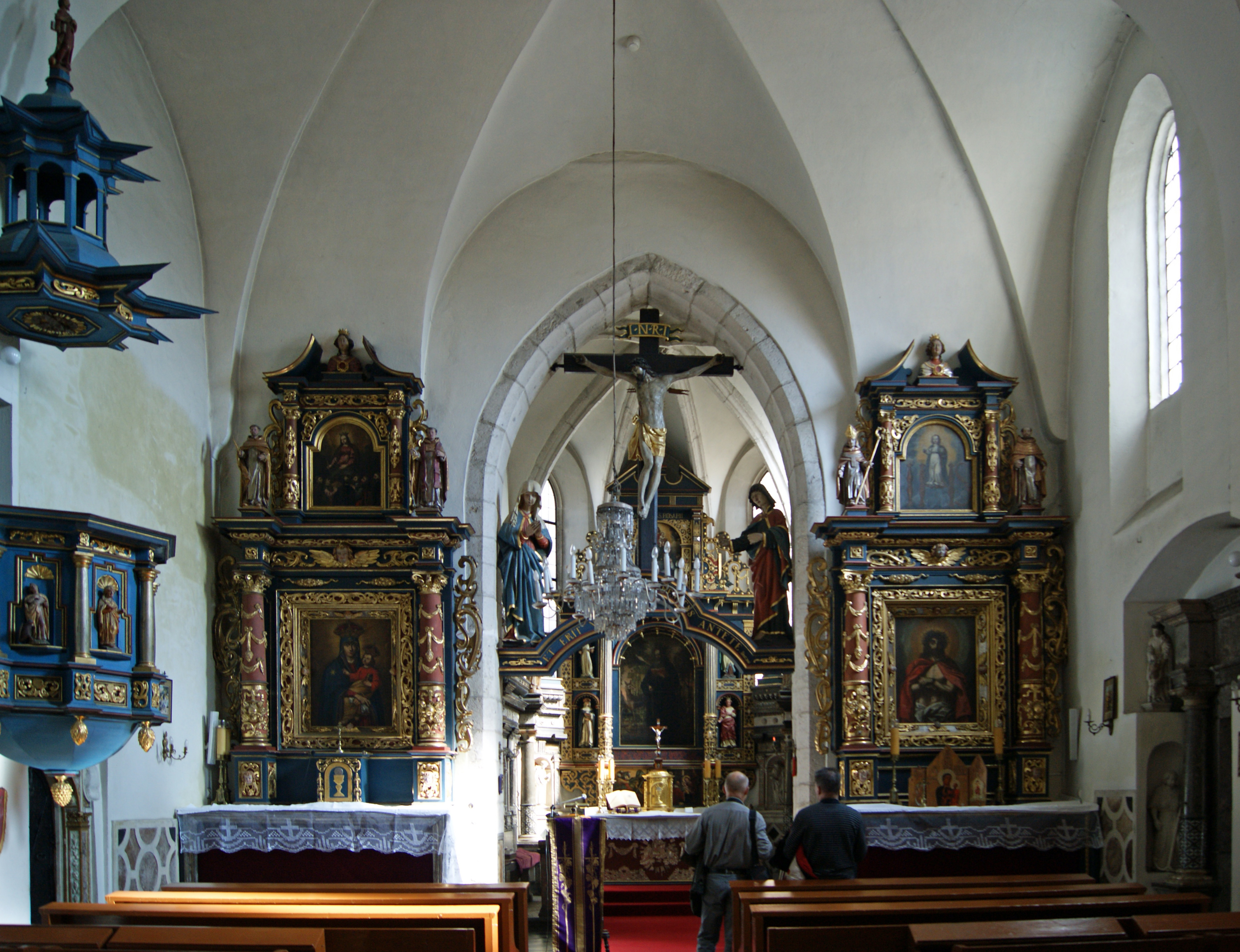
Interior
