= Grodzka Street, Kraków =

Street in Kraków, Poland

Grodzka Street
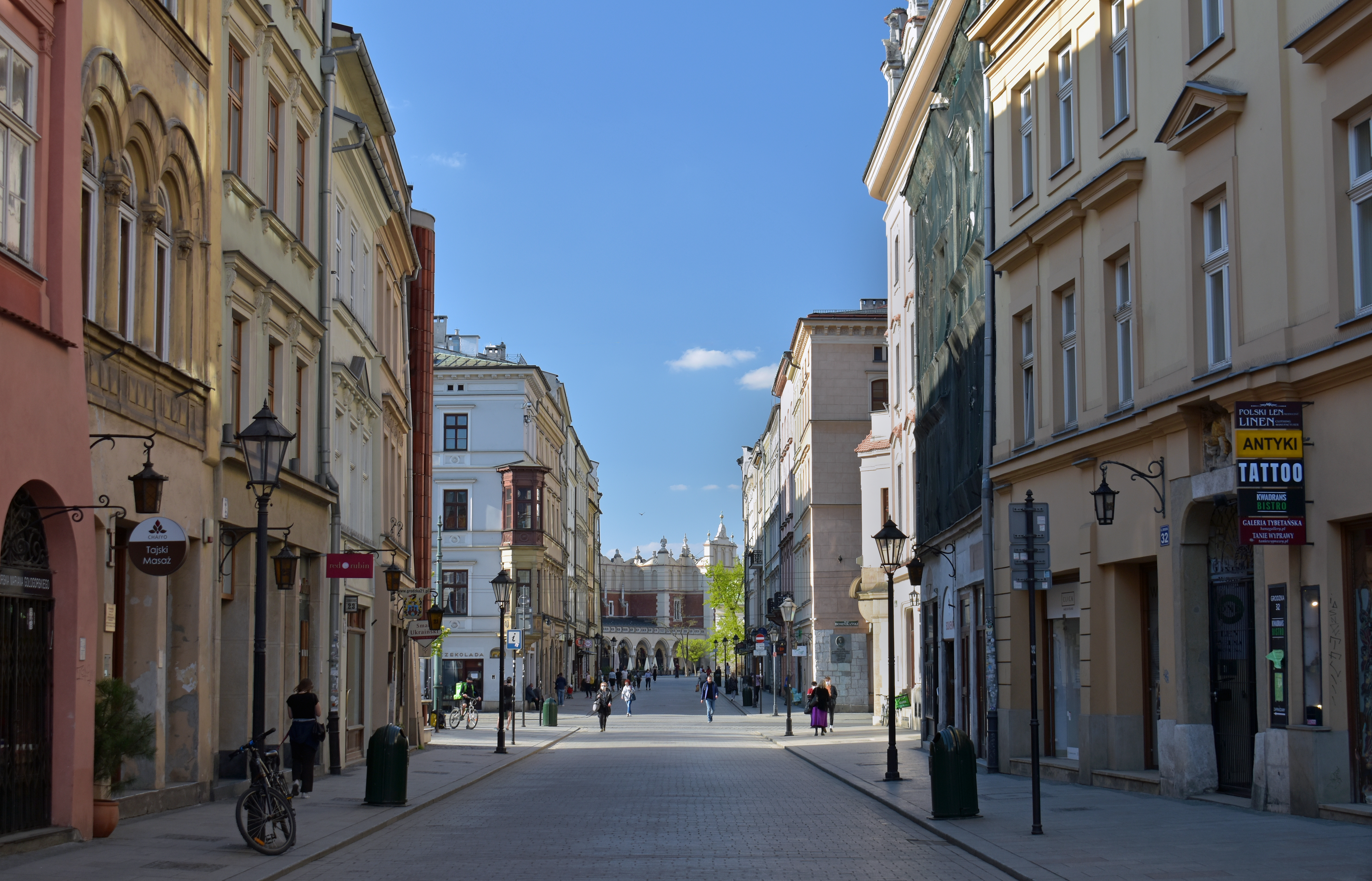
- View of the intersection with Dominikańska Street, and the Sukiennice Cloth Hall in the distance.

- Length: 650 m (2,130 ft)
- North end: Main Market Square
- South end: Wawel

UNESCO World Heritage Site
- Type: Cultural
- Criteria: iv
- Designated: 1978
- Part of: Historic Centre of Kraków
- Reference no.: 29
- Region: Europe and North America

Historic Monument of Poland
- Designated: 1994-09-08
- Part of: Kraków historical city complex
- Reference no.: M.P. 1994 nr 50 poz. 418

Grodzka Street (Polish: Ulica Grodzka, lit. Gord Street) is one of the oldest streets in Kraków, Poland. Grodzka was part of a former north–south trade route. The street is part of the Royal Route, used by Polish kings to reach Wawel Castle. The earliest documents referencing its name date from the thirteenth century.

Part of the street was destroyed by the Kraków Fire of 1850. In the later half of the 19th century, a tramway track was laid on Grodzka Street.

== Features ==
- Celestyńska Tenement – tenement at 1 Grodzka Street,
- Szarffenbergów Tenement – tenement at 3 Grodzka Street,
- Liberowska Tenement – tenement at 21 Grodzka Street,
- Swiechowiczowska Tenement – tenement at 23 Grodzka Street,
- Wojnarowicowska Tenement – tenement at 25 Grodzka Street,
- Markowicowska Tenement – tenement at 27 Grodzka Street,
- Salomońska Tenement – tenement at 33 Grodzka Street,
- 50 Grodzka Street – tenement.

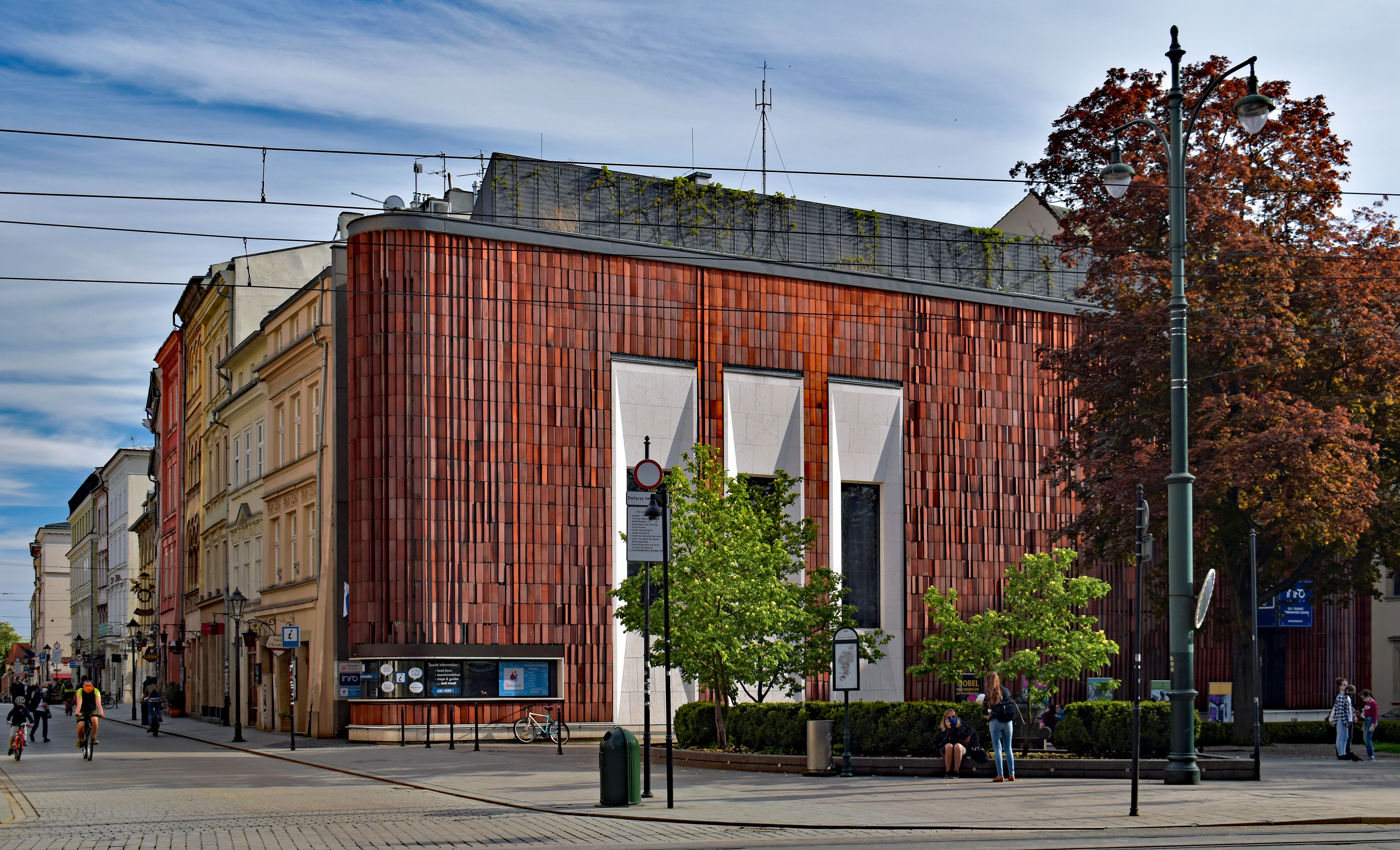
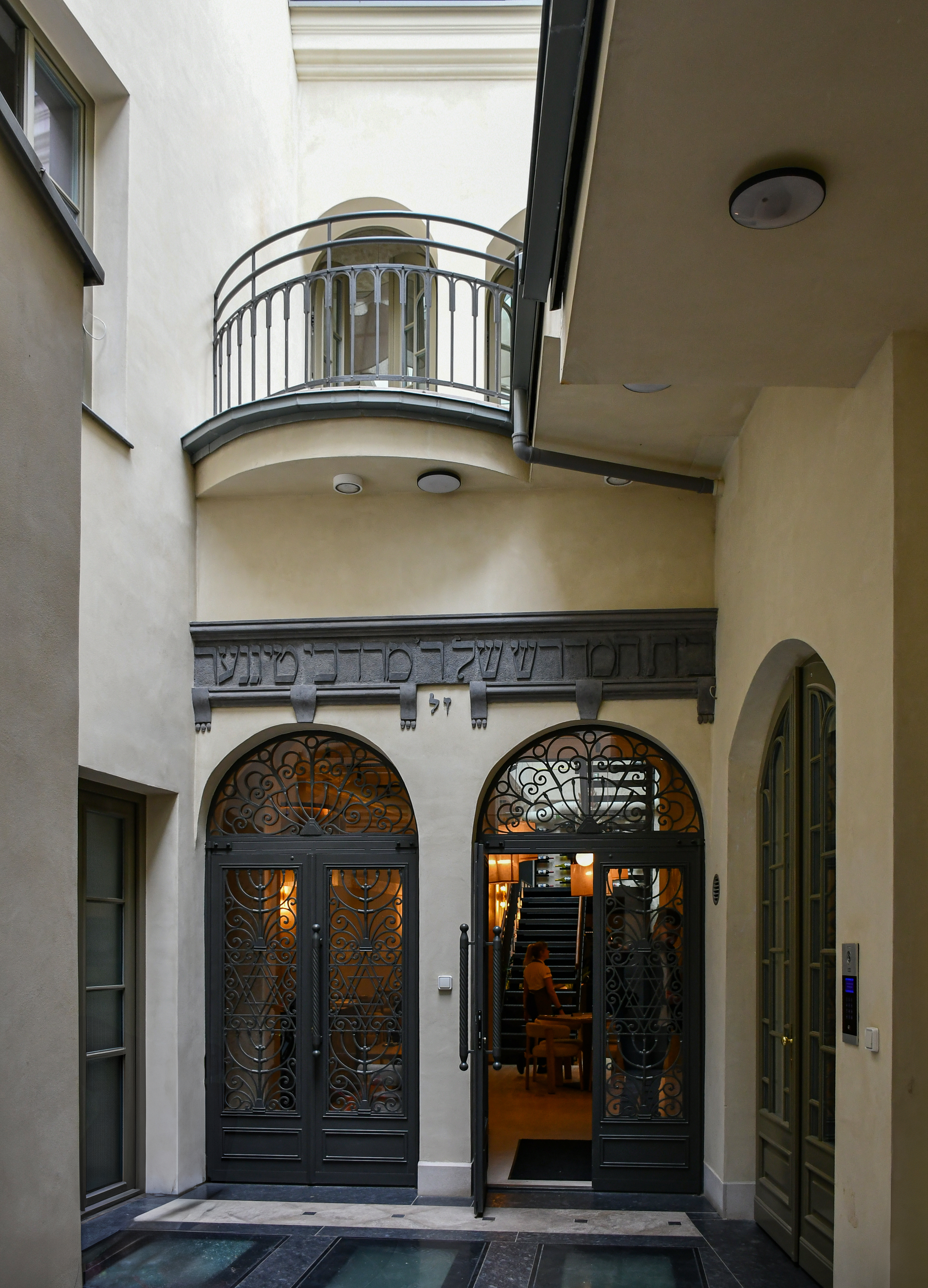
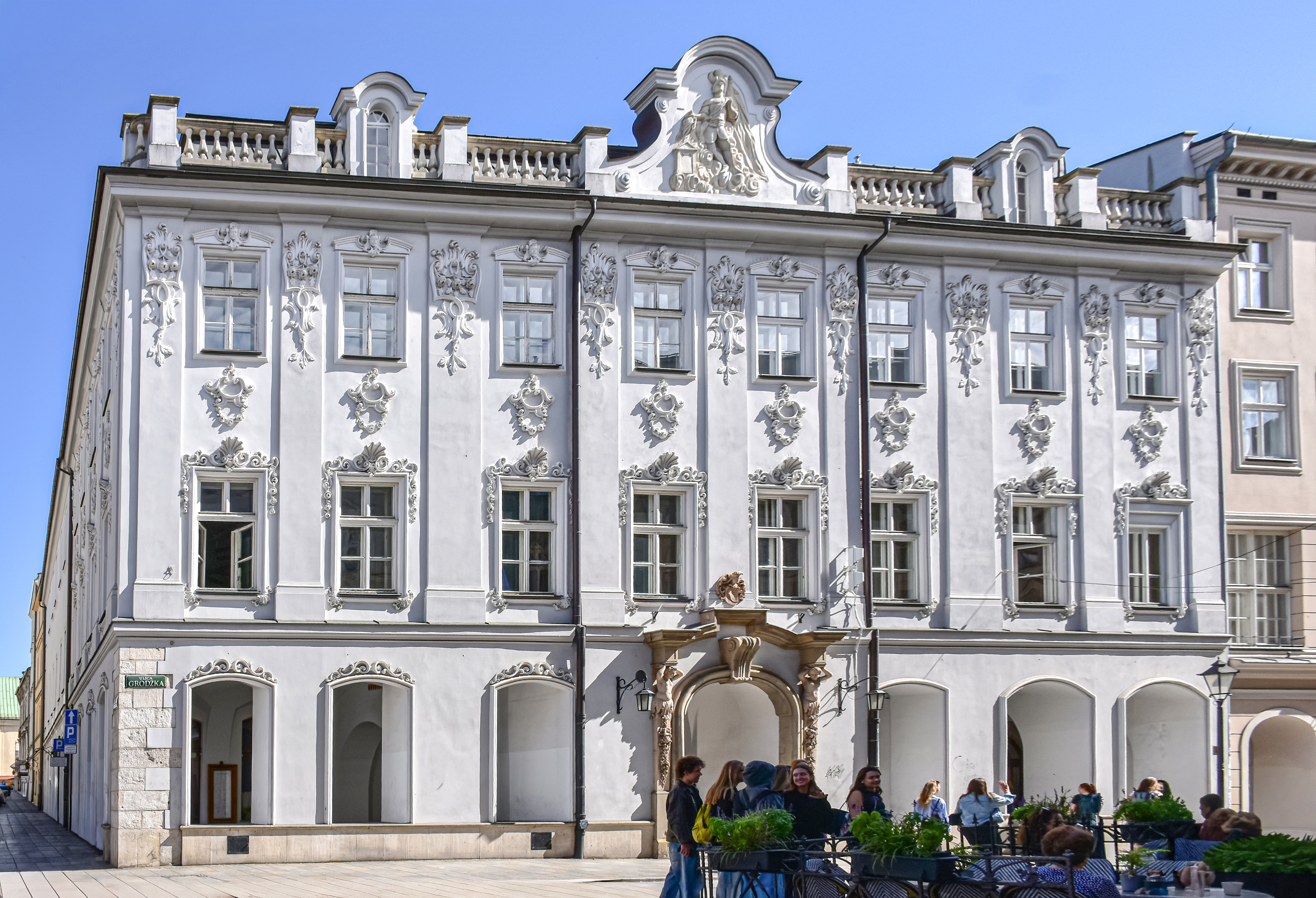
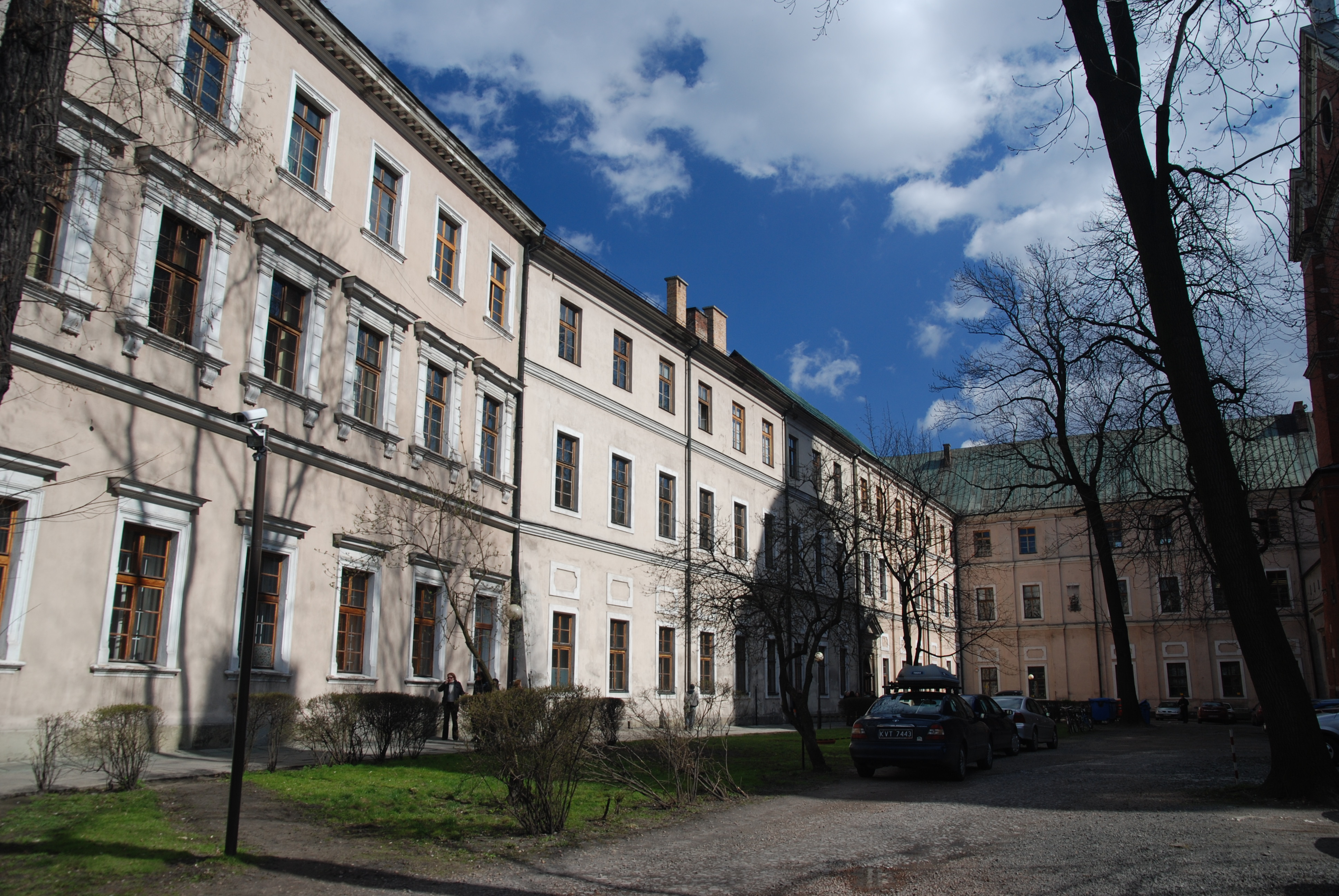
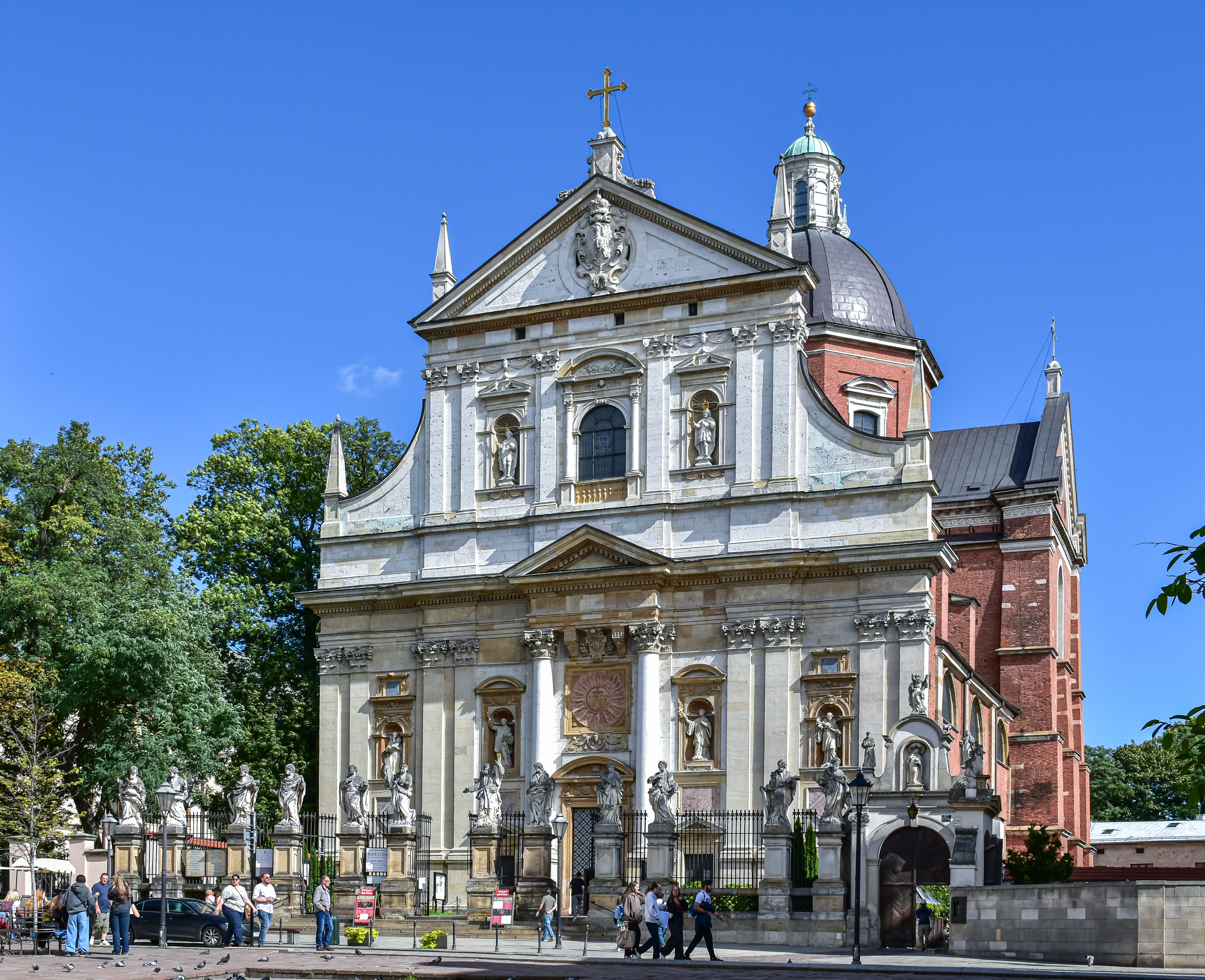
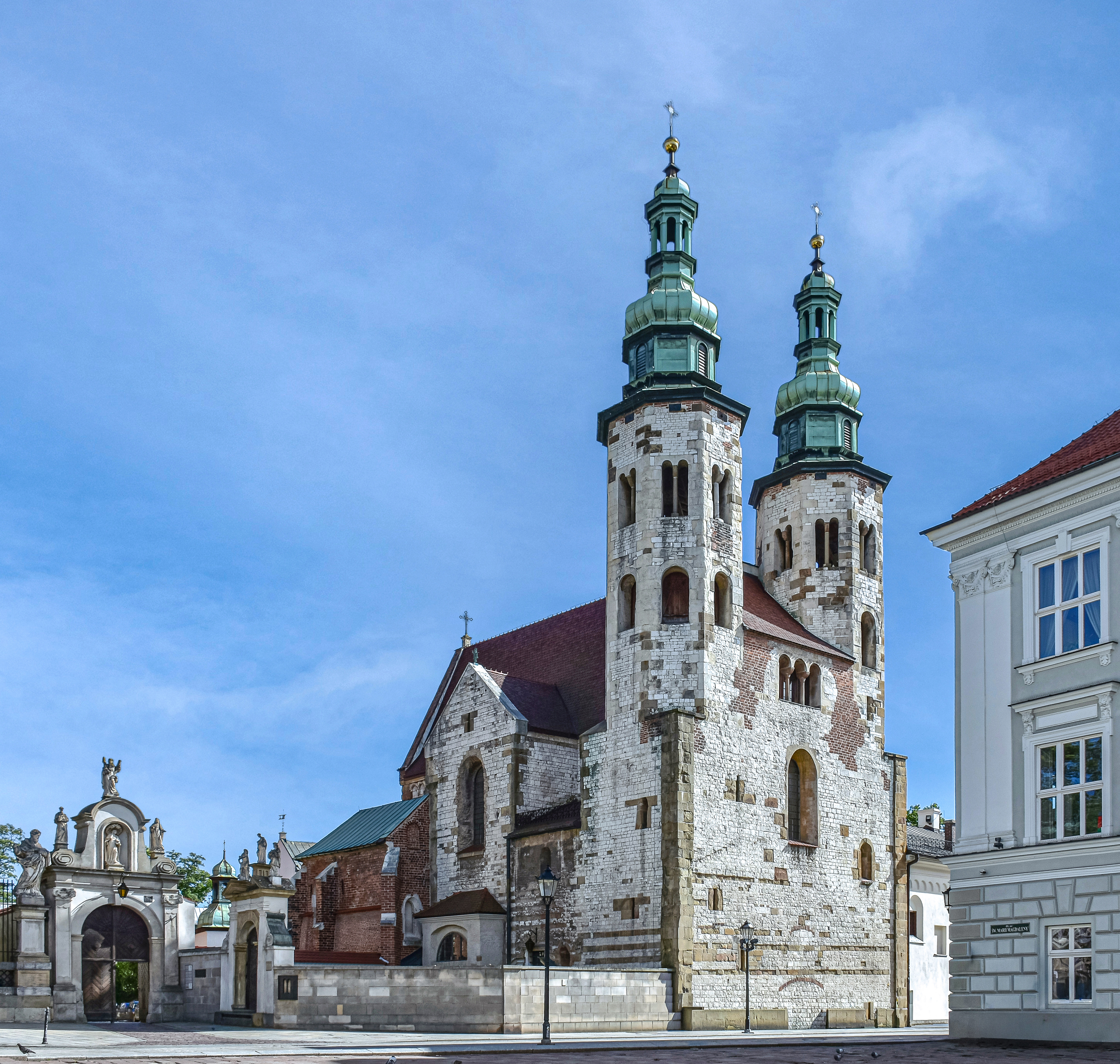
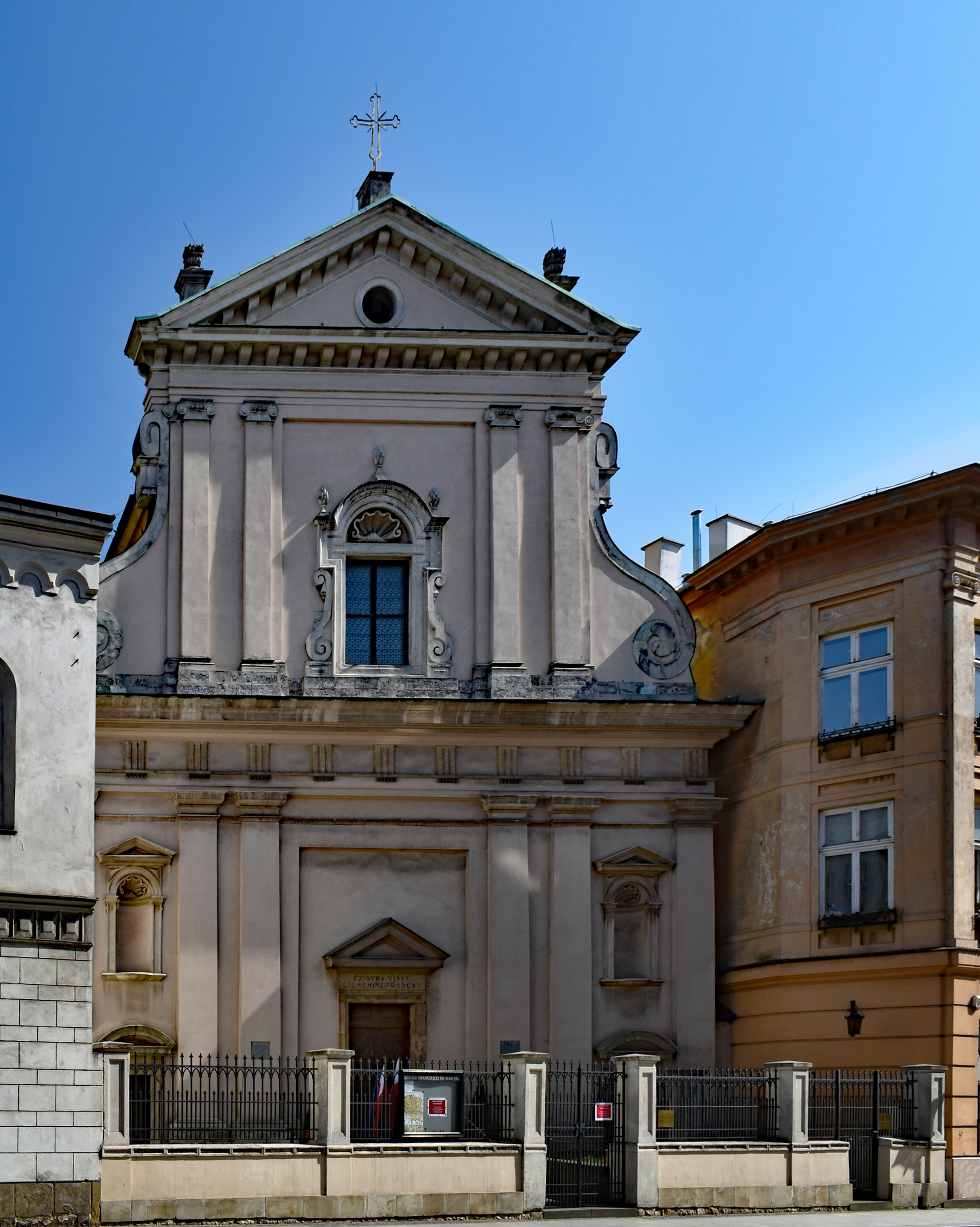
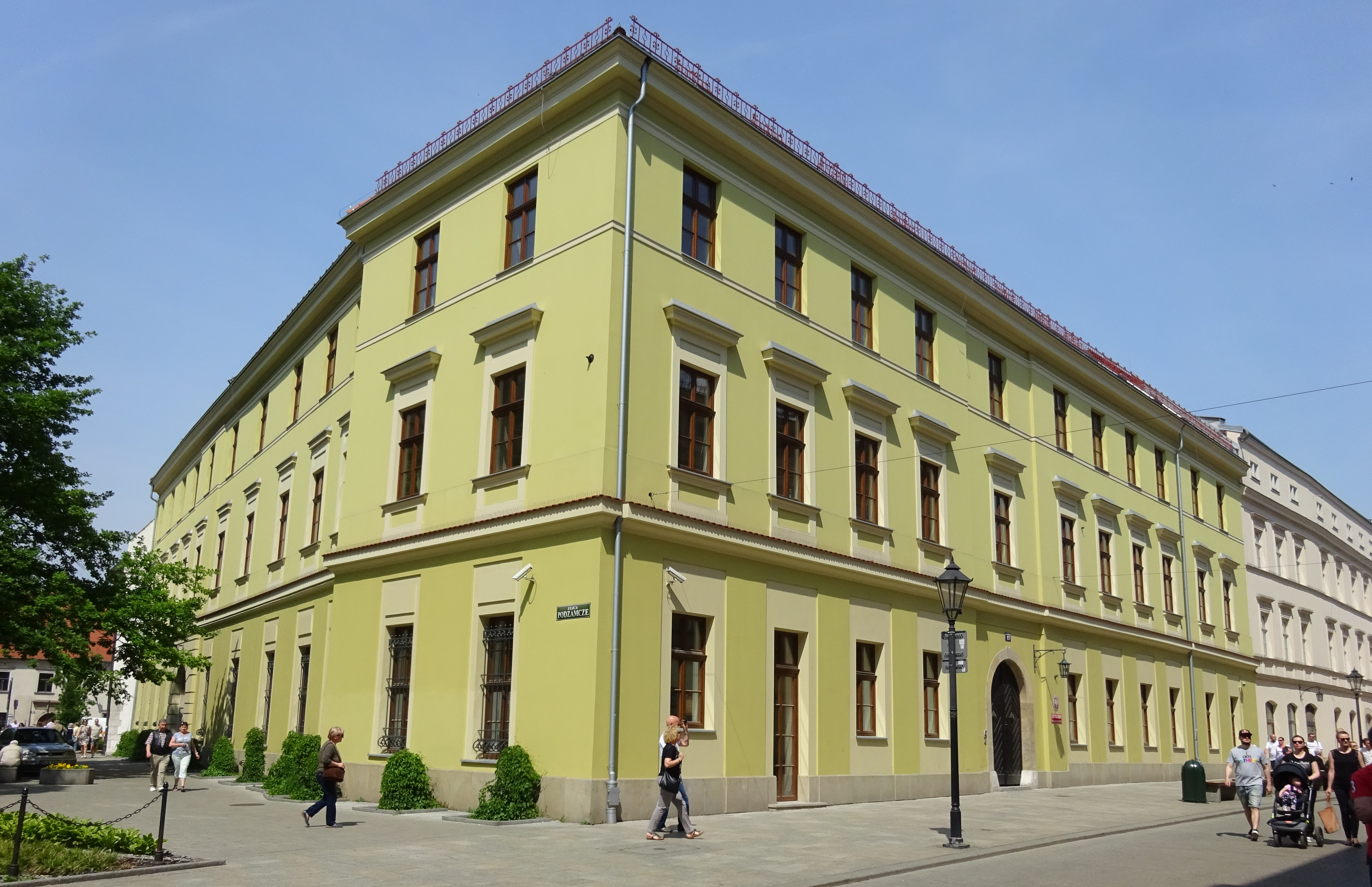
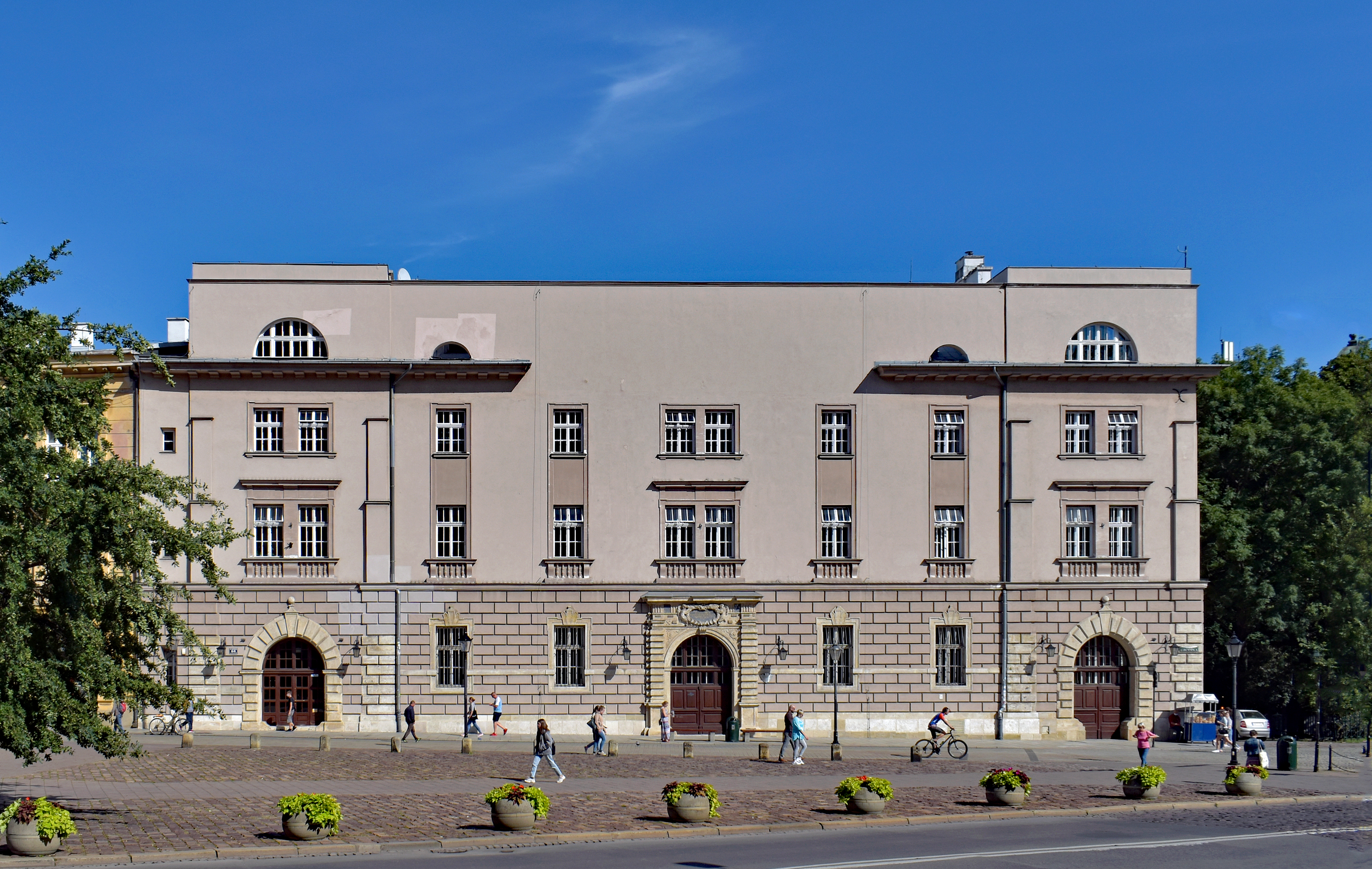
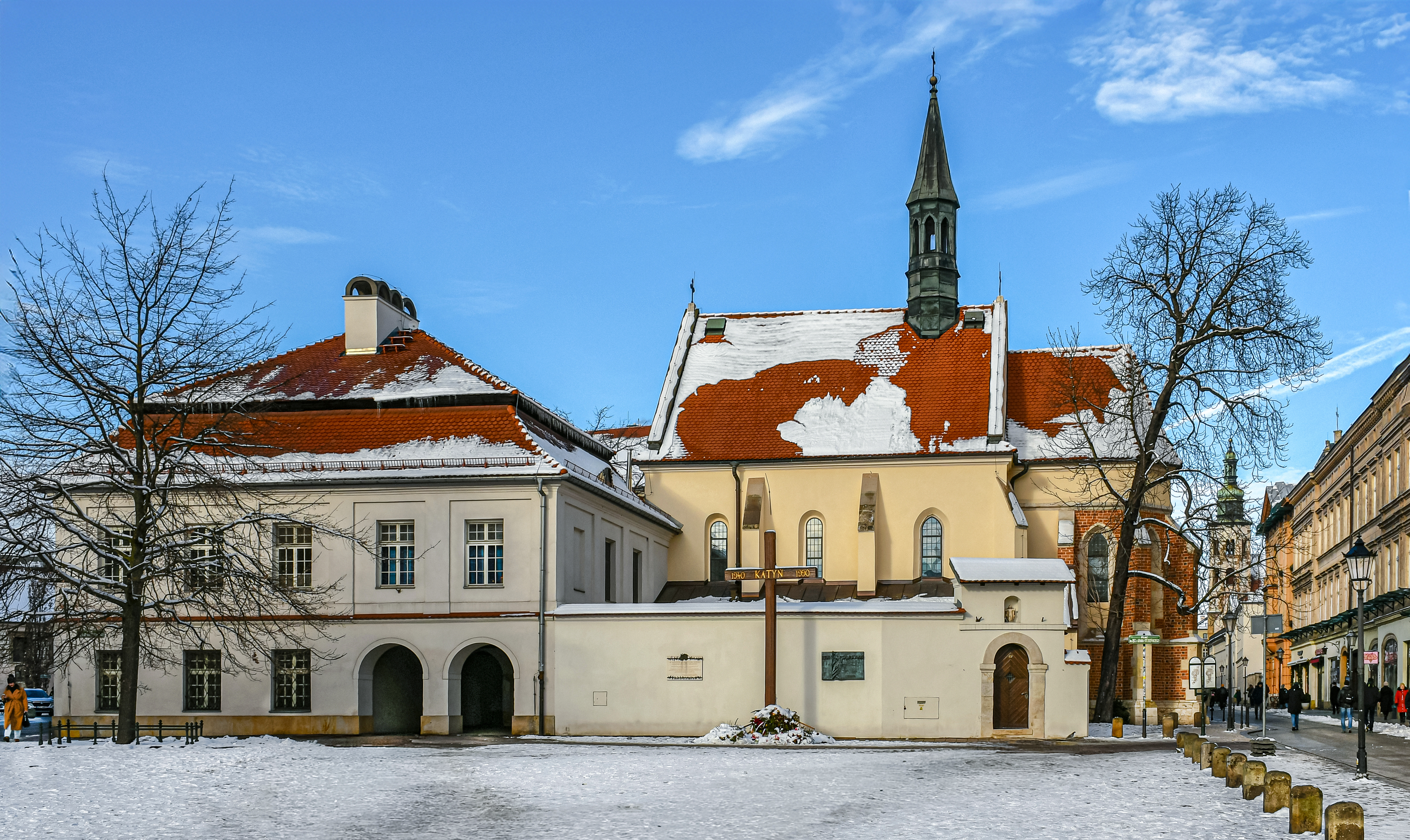
Street No.	Short description	Picture
19	Wyspiański Pavilion – Modern building, a stained-glass image based on never previously implemented designs by Stanisław Wyspiański is set in the three windows of the façade.
28-30	Former Mordechai Tigner Beit Midrash.
40	Stadnicki Palace – a nineteenth-century palace with a rococo façade.
52	Former Jesuit Collegium from the first quarter of the seventeenth century. The Jesuits opened a school here, as to compete with the Jagiellonian University. Then the seat of the Senate of the Free City of Cracow. Presently, the building is home to the Collegium Broscianum of the Jagiellonian University.
54	Saints Peter and Paul Church – a Roman Catholic, Polish Baroque church, built in the early seventeenth century.
56	St. Andrew's Church – a historical Romanesque church, built in the late eleventh century as a fortress church used for defensive purposes.
58	St. Martin's Church – a Lutheran/Calvinist church, built in the first half of the seventeenth century.
65	Gniezno Bishop's Palace – a palace from the seventeenth century, rebuilt in the Classicist architectural style in the nineteenth century.
64	Royal Arsenal – built in 1643. Presently Faculty of Polish Studies at the Jagiellonian University.
67	Church of St. Giles – a church built in the fourteenth century.
