= Dominikańska Street =

Street in Kraków, Poland

Dominikańska street
Kraków
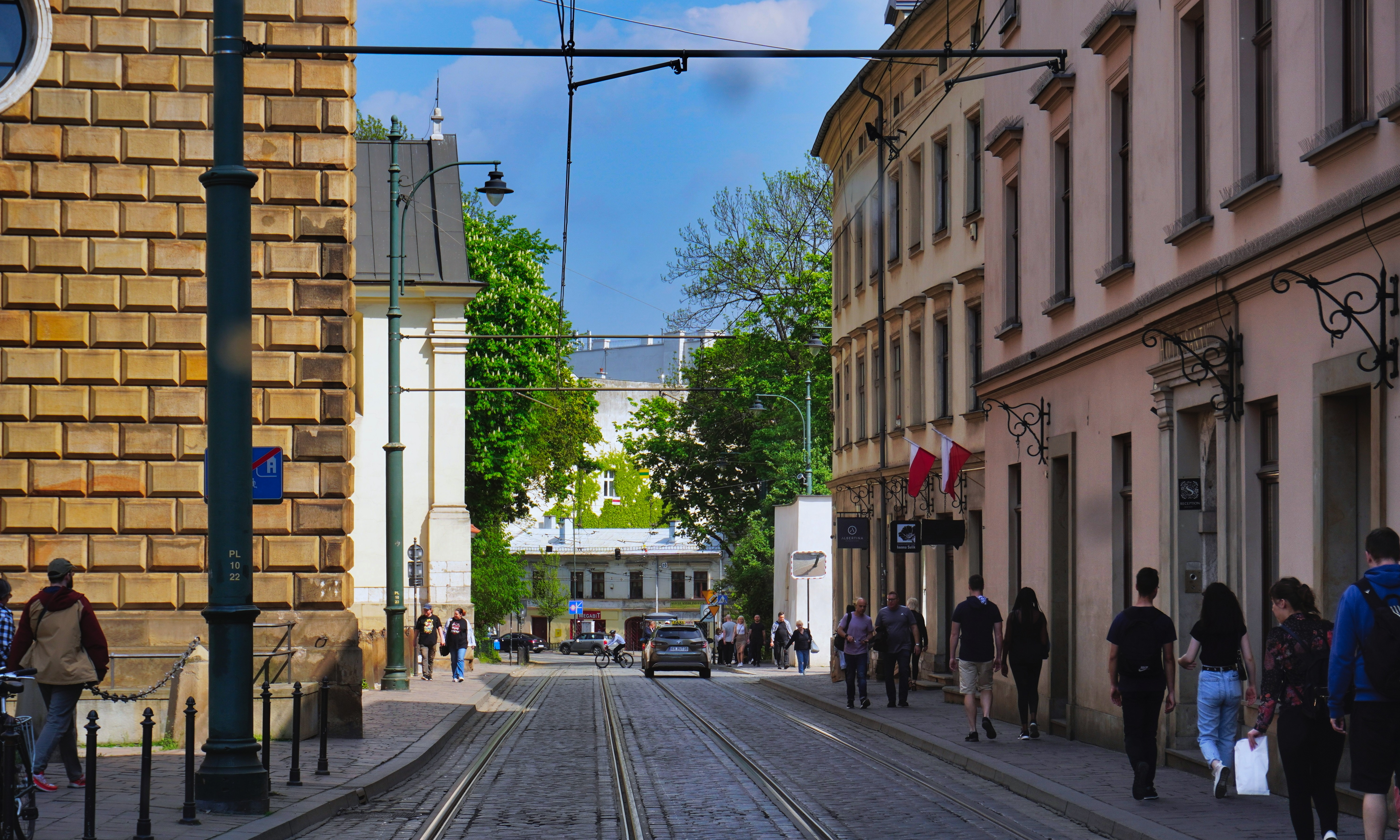
- View of the west from Dominikański Square
- Interactive map of Dominikańska street
- Part of: Kraków Old Town district
- Owner: City of Kraków
- Location: Kraków, Poland

Dominikańska Street is a street in Kraków, in district Old Town.

It connects Dominikański Square with Saint Gertrude Street. It is a single-carriageway street with a tram track running along it.

== History ==
The street was laid out in its current form in 1824 after the closure of the church cemetery and the demolition of the defensive walls, when the Planty Park was being established. The first tram line here was opened on January 17, 1913.

The street features the Basilica of the Holy Trinity and the Church of Saint Joseph. It is part of the Lesser Poland Way, running from Sandomierz to Tyniec.

== Buildings ==
- 1 Dominikańska Street – tenement house, 19th century.
- 3–5 Dominikańska Street – tenement house, 19th century.
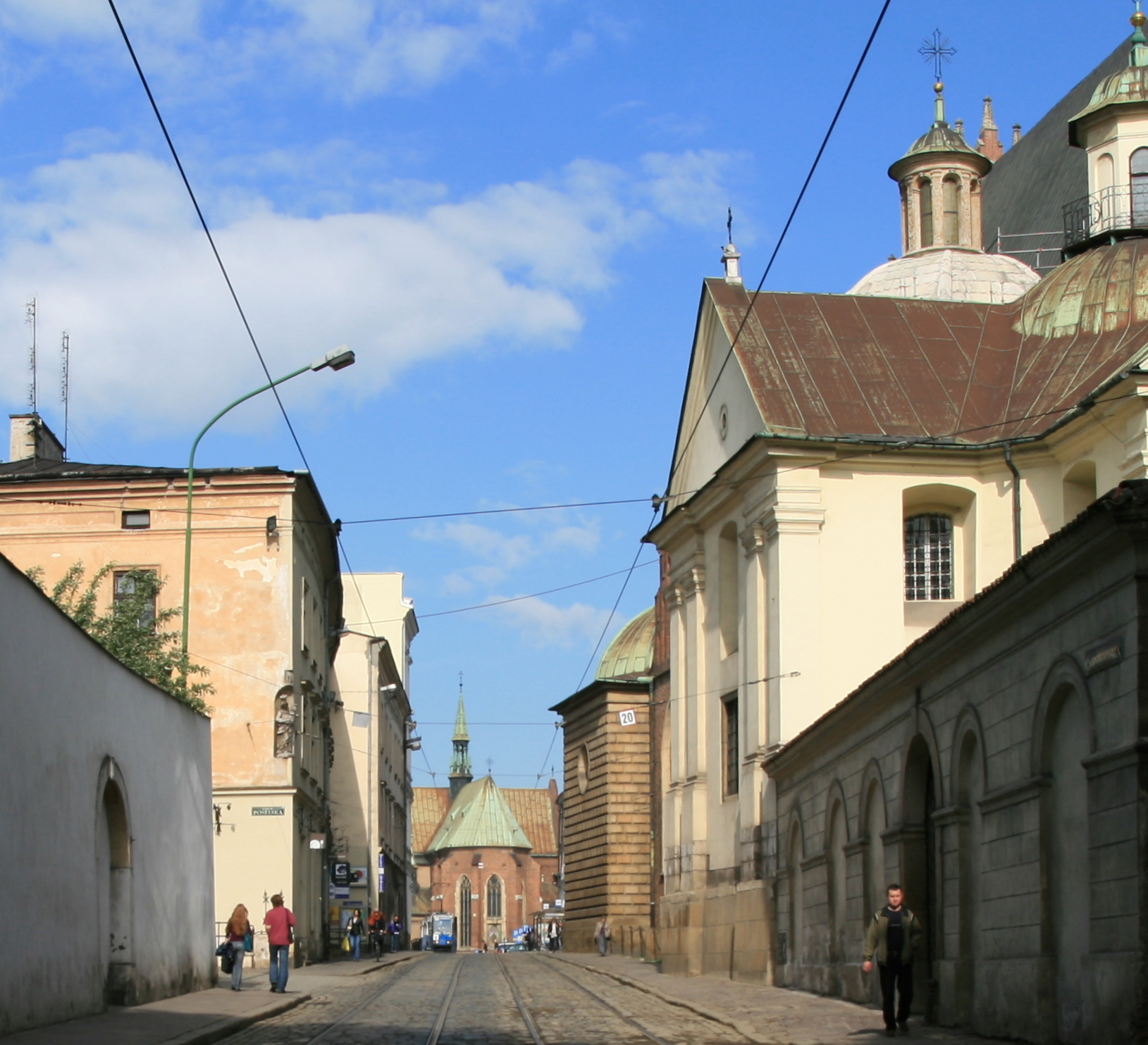
View from Planty Park to the west

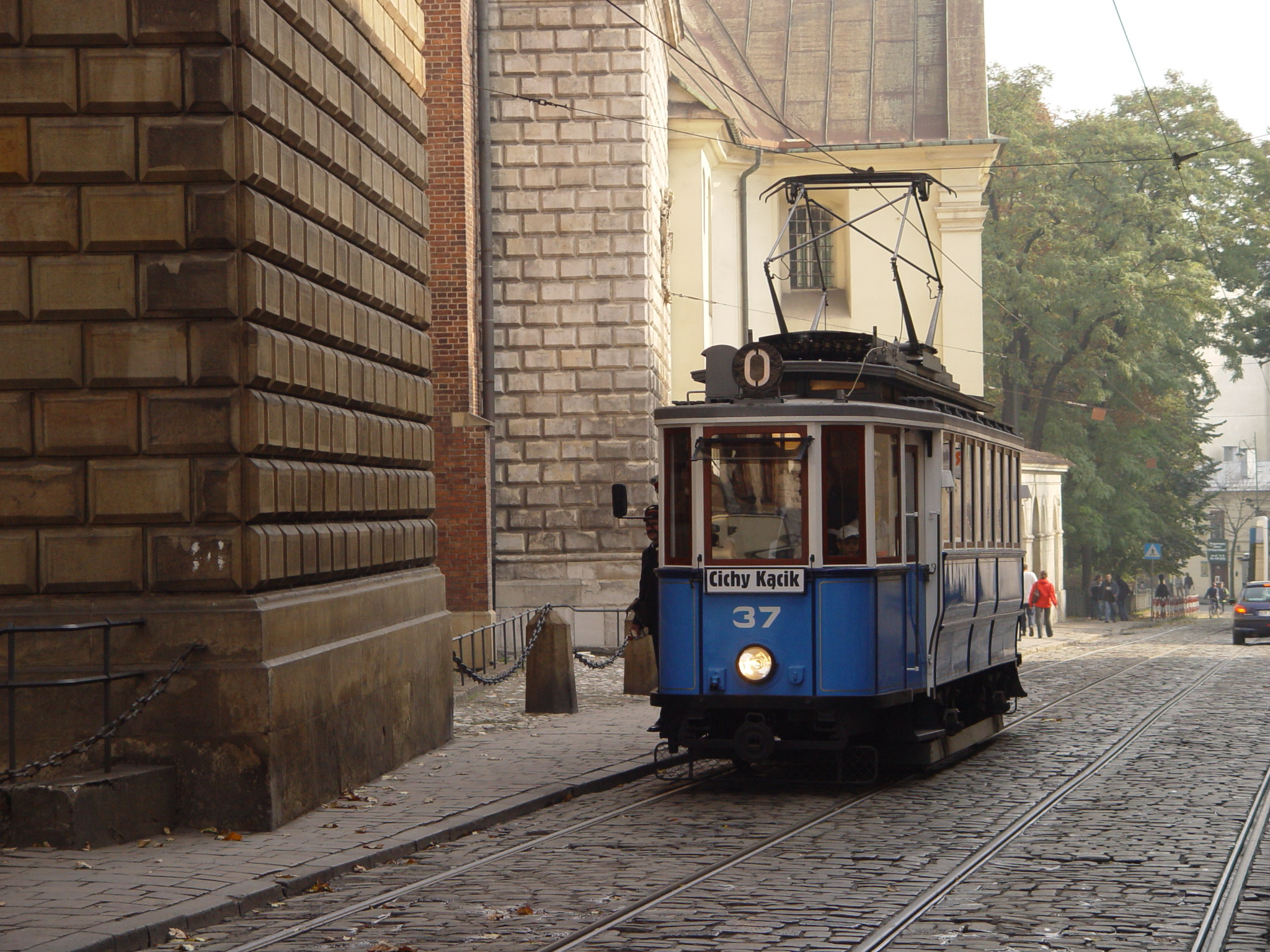
Historic tram on Dominikańska Street (2005)
