= Kraków Fire of 1850 =

Urban fire (Kraków, Austrian Empire; 1850)

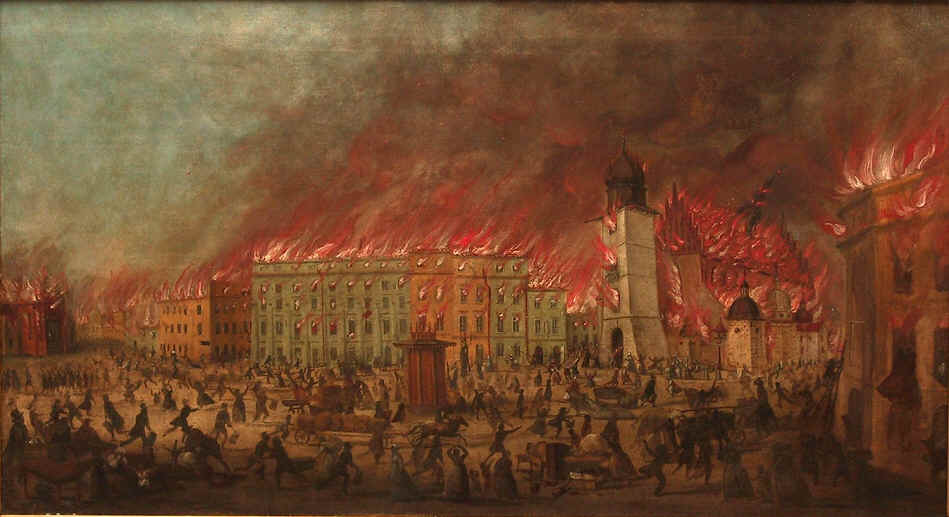
- Fire of Kraków as painted by Baltazar Stachowicz. Gothic Basilica of the Holy Trinity at the Dominikanski Square (right of center).
- Date: July 18, 1850
- Location: Kraków, Austrian Empire (now in Poland)
- Type: Fire

The Kraków Fire of 1850 started on 18 July and lasted several days. It is estimated to have destroyed about 10 percent of the city of Kraków, which was then part of the Austrian Empire's district of the Grand Duchy.

== Background ==
In 1850 the city of Kraków was still heavily reliant on wood as construction material. Most of the 1700 buildings in the city were wooden, and the masonry ones had many wooden elements. The city had poor water infrastructure, and no full-time fire service.

== The fire ==
The fire started on 18 July on city outskirts around the Krupnicza Street, in the grain mill area. The fire is attributed to an accident caused by a miller and a smith, who while fixing some equipment started a fire in a mill building which then spiraled out of control. The fire grew due to strong winds which spread it to nearby buildings, affecting the city center. Within hours it affected over eight streets, though it was stopped from spreading further. Jagiellonian University students prevented it from causing more than superficial damage to the university's library. The spread of the fire was stopped within one day, but it took several more days and military's assistance to eliminate it completely.

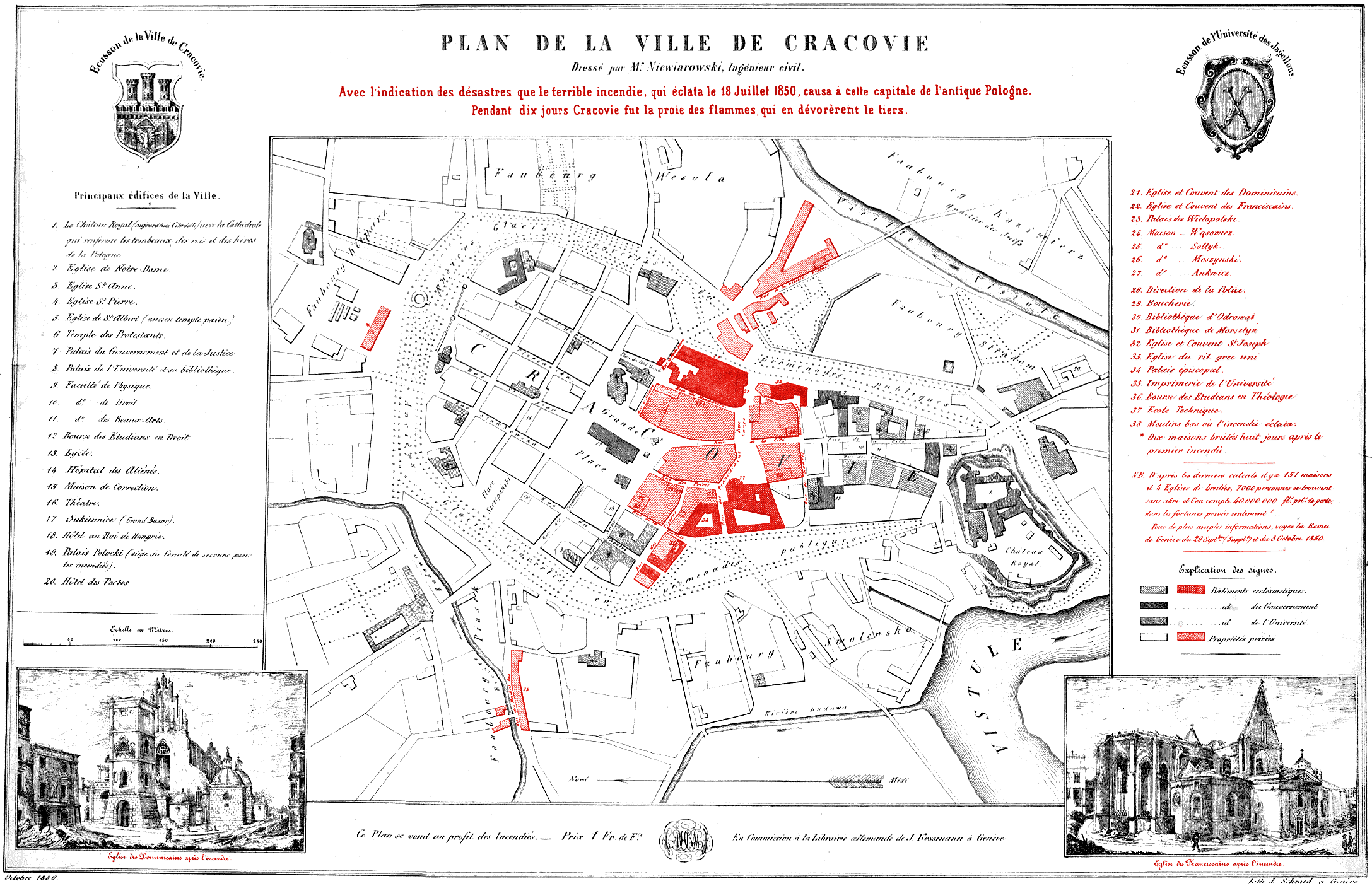
Map of Kraków with areas destroyed by the fire marked in red. Southeast corner of Main Square, on both sides of Grodzka Street, extending east and west to the Planty Park.

The fire caused the destruction of approximately one tenth of the city: 153 buildings, two palaces, two or three monasteries, and four churches.

== Aftermath ==
The fire was responsible for subsequent economic stagnation in the city. The fire also made the city government increase the fire fighting budget, though the first (voluntary) fire service would not be established until 1865. Final restoration of all affected buildings was finished only in 1912.

== Destroyed or damaged landmarks ==
- Bishop's Palace, Kraków
- Wielopolski Palace
- Church of St. Francis of Assisi, Kraków
- Basilica of the Holy Trinity, Kraków
