= Registry of Cultural Property (Poland) =

Heritage register

The blue shield design used by the Registry

Registry of Cultural Property (Polish: Rejestr zabytków) in Poland is a heritage register for Polish cultural property. It is maintained by the 16 voivodeship offices for cultural property protection (Polish: wojewódzkie urzędy ochrony zabytków) headed by a voivodeship cultural property conservator (Polish: wojewódzki konserwator zabytków) acting on behalf of the voivode as the first-tier registration organ. In addition, selected units of territorial self-government: gminas, cities with county rights and counties have used an option to appoint a communal, municipal, city or county cultural property conservator (Polish: gminny, miejski lub powiatowy konserwator zabytków), (Note: The Act also foresees an option to appoint a cultural property conservator by an inter-municipal, inter-county, or cross-category municipal-county union, as well as by a metropolitan union) with some tasks of the voivodeship conservator usually delegated to such an office under an agreement with the respective voivode. The cultural property data is processed at the national level by the National Institute of Cultural Heritage (Polish: Narodowy Instytut Dziedzictwa), the latter also operating the National List of Intangible Cultural Heritage on behalf of the minister responsible for national cultural heritage, while all the abovementioned institutions are overseen by the General Cultural Property Conservator (Polish: Generalny Konserwator Zabytków), an office fulfilling the tasks of the second-tier registration organ, held by a secretary or an undersecretary of state at the ministry responsible for national cultural heritage and acting on behalf of the minister.

The Act on cultural property protection and care divides the cultural property into three categories: (A) movable cultural property, (B) immovable cultural property, and (C) archaeological cultural property.

It does not cover the movable items included in the national library collections, the national archival fonds or in an inventory of a listed museum.
