= Church of St. Mark the Evangelist, Kraków =

Roman Catholic church in Kraków, Poland

Church of St. Mark the Evangelist
- Kościół św. Marka Ewangelisty
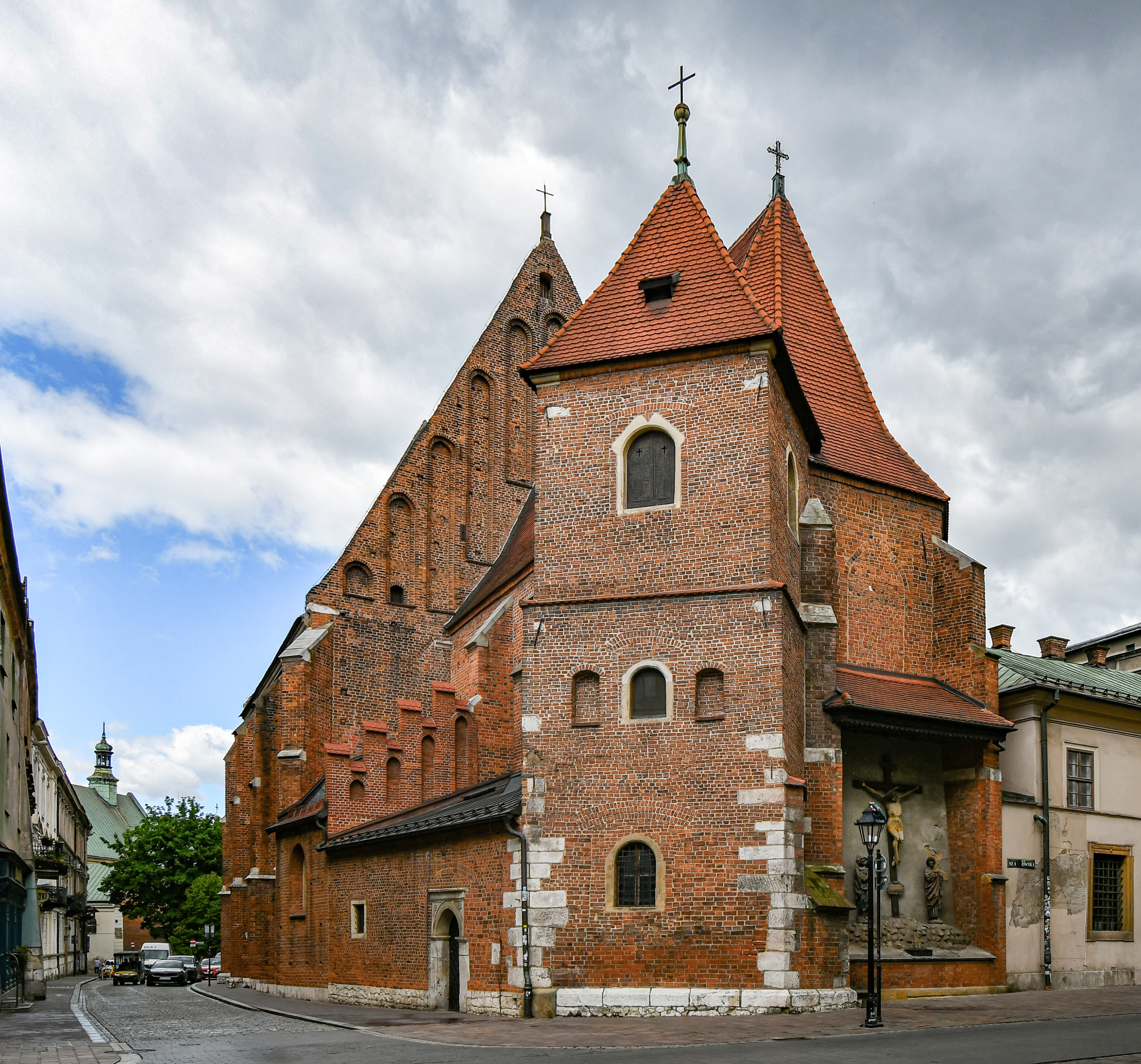
- Church of St. Mark the Evangelist
- 50°03′52.3″N 19°56′15.7″E
- Location: Kraków
- Address: 10 św. Marka Street
- Country: Poland
- Denomination: Roman Catholic
- Website: https://swietymarek.pl/

History
- Consecrated: after 1257

UNESCO World Heritage Site
- Type: Cultural
- Criteria: iv
- Designated: 1978
- Part of: Historic Centre of Kraków
- Reference no.: 29
- Region: Europe and North America

Historic Monument of Poland
- Designated: 1994-09-08
- Part of: Kraków historical city complex
- Reference no.: M.P. 1994 nr 50 poz. 418

The Church of St. Mark the Evangelist (Polish: Kościół św. Marka Ewangelisty), is a historic Roman Catholic church located at 10 św. Marka Street in Old Town of Kraków, Poland.

Former conventual church of the Canons Regular of the Penitence of the Blessed Martyrs.

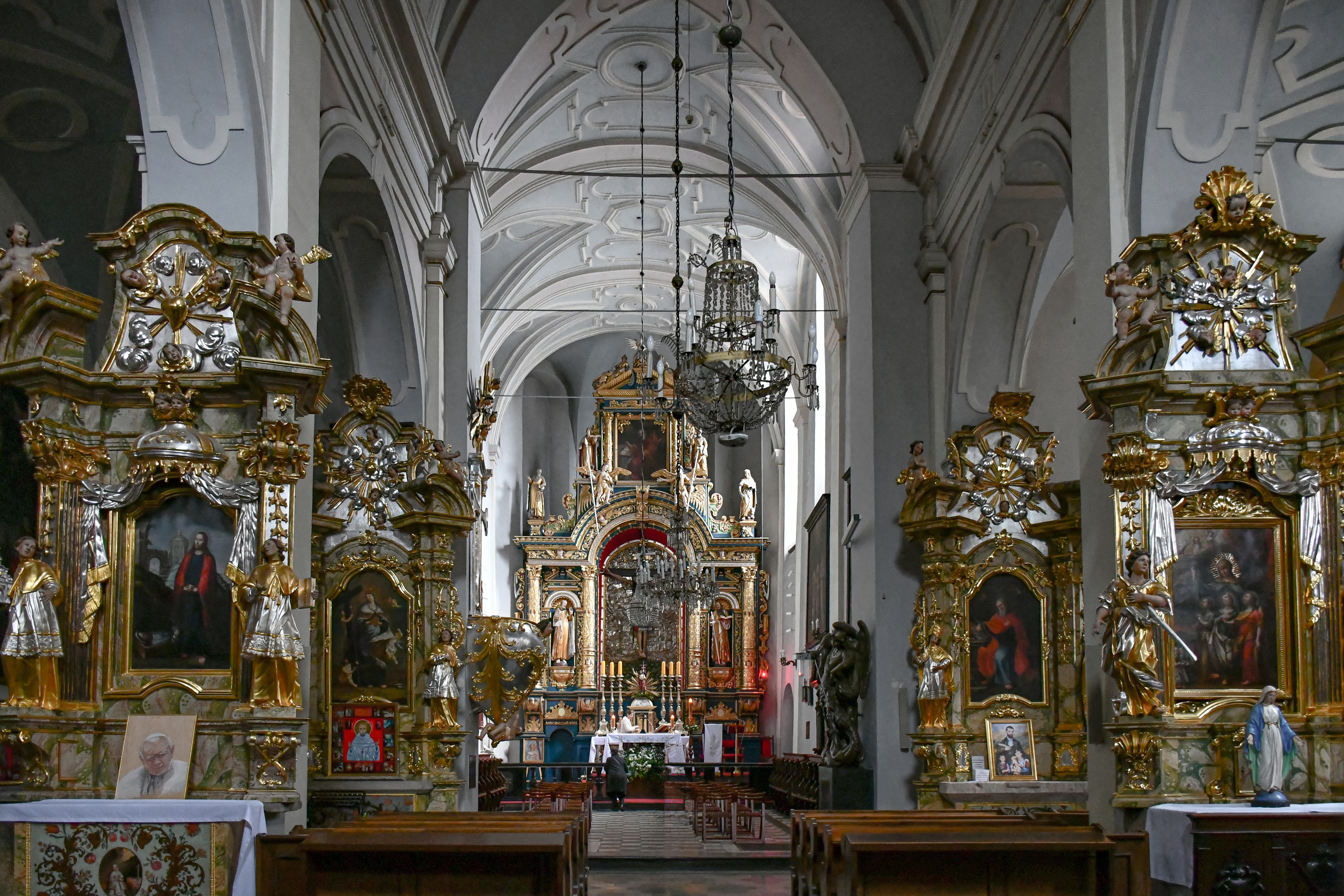
Interior of the church

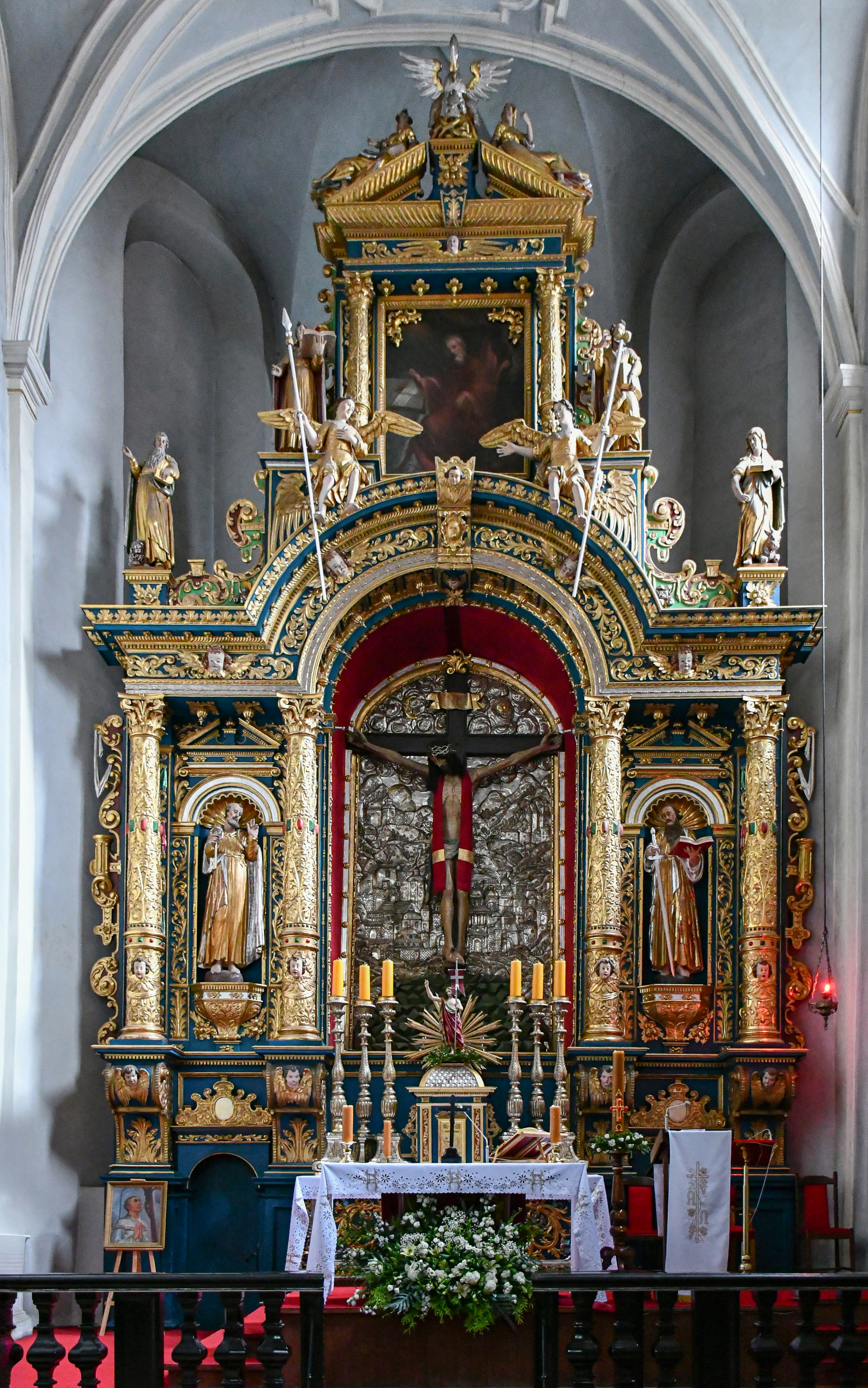
Main altar

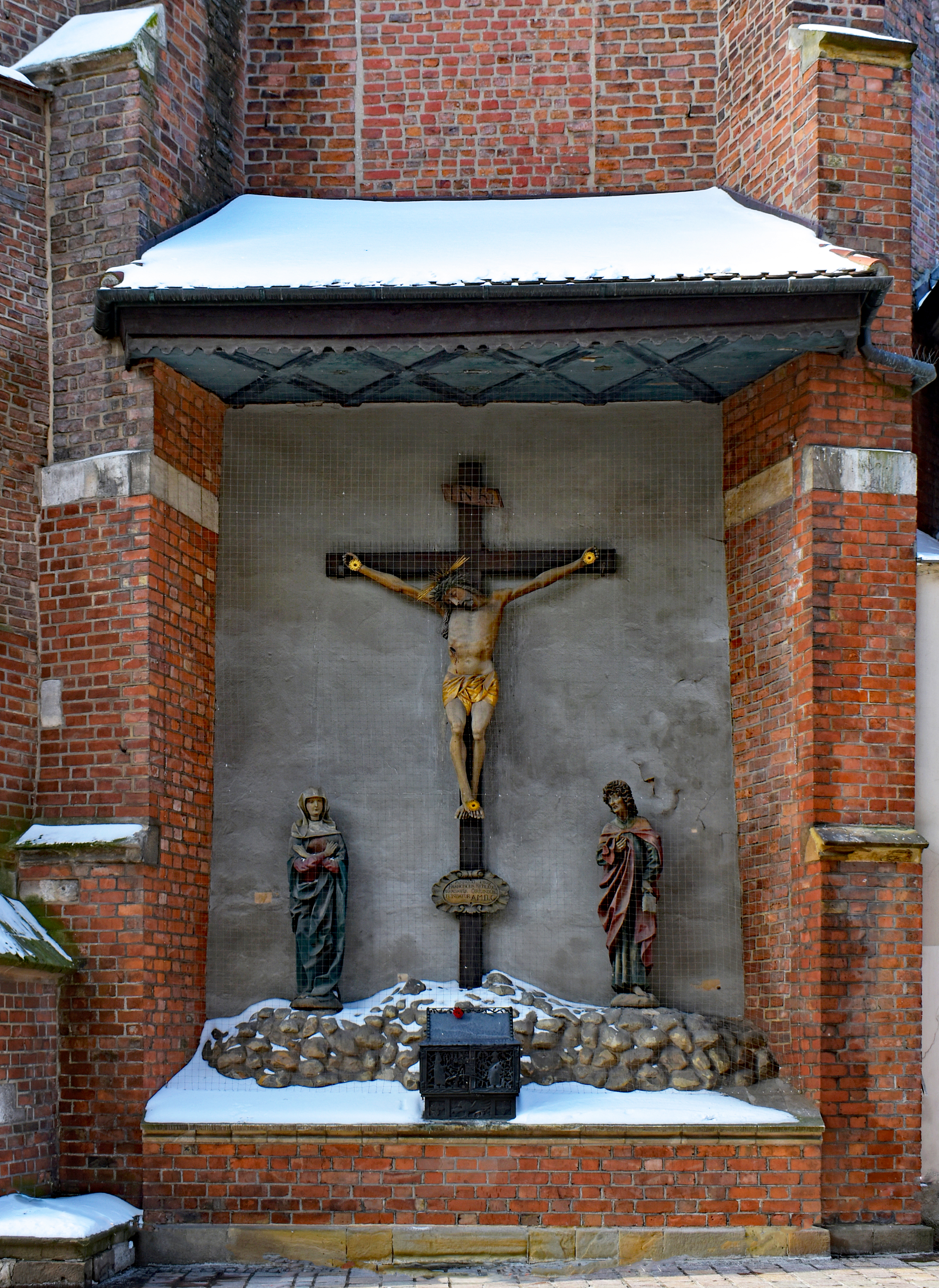
Golgotha

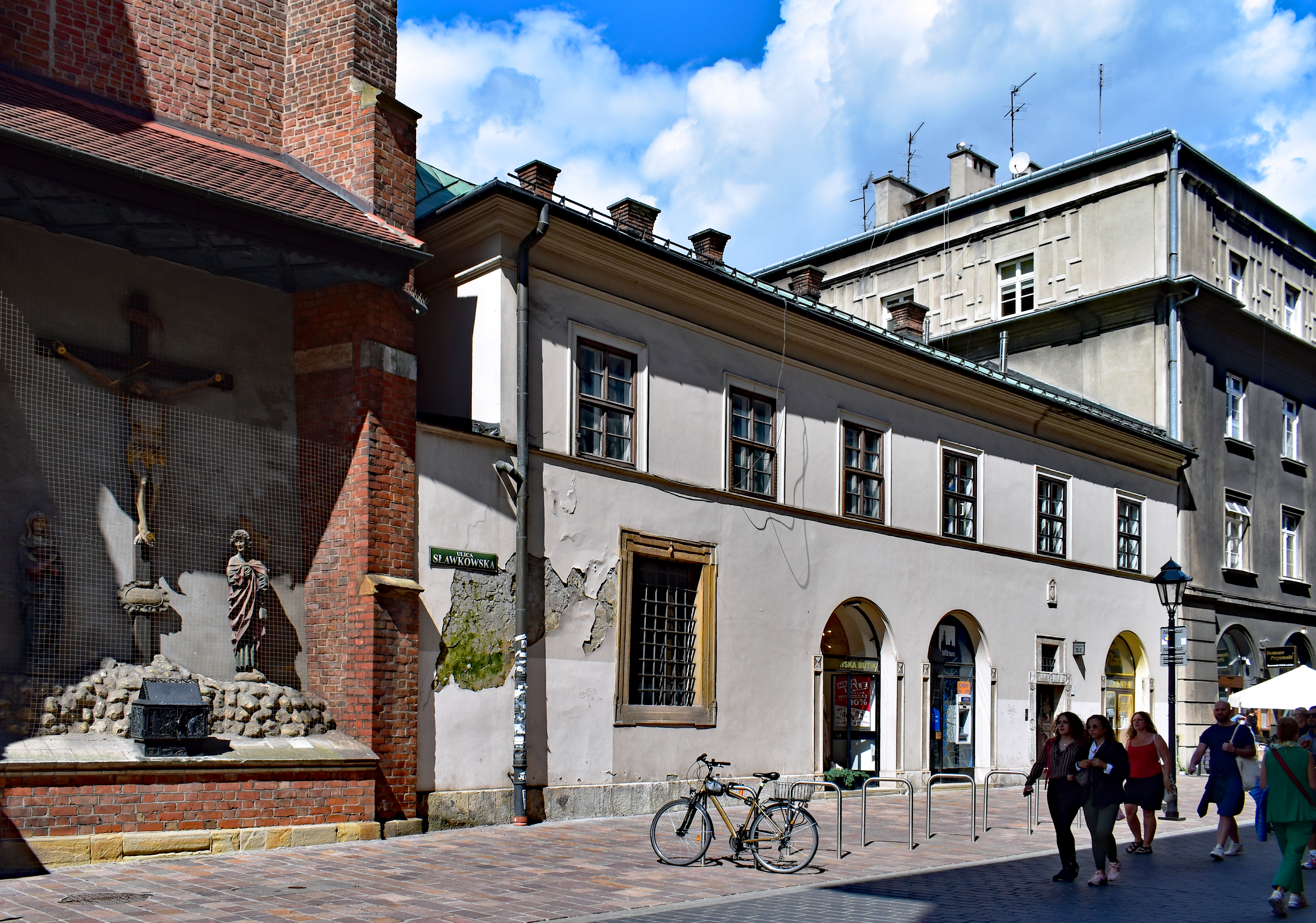
Former monastery of the Canons Regular of the Penitence of the Blessed Martyrs
24 Sławkowska Street

== Bibliography ==
- (in Polish) Michał Rożek, Barbara Gądkowa Leksykon kościołów Krakowa, Wydawnictwo Verso, Kraków 2003, ISBN 83-919281-0-1 pp 85-86 (Lexicon of Krakow churches)
- (in Polish) Praca zbiorowa Encyklopedia Krakowa, wydawca Biblioteka Kraków i Muzeum Krakowa, Kraków 2023, ISBN 978-83-66253-46-9 volume I page 751 (Encyclopedia of Krakow)
