= Sławkowska Street, Kraków =

Street in Kraków, Poland

Sławkowska Street
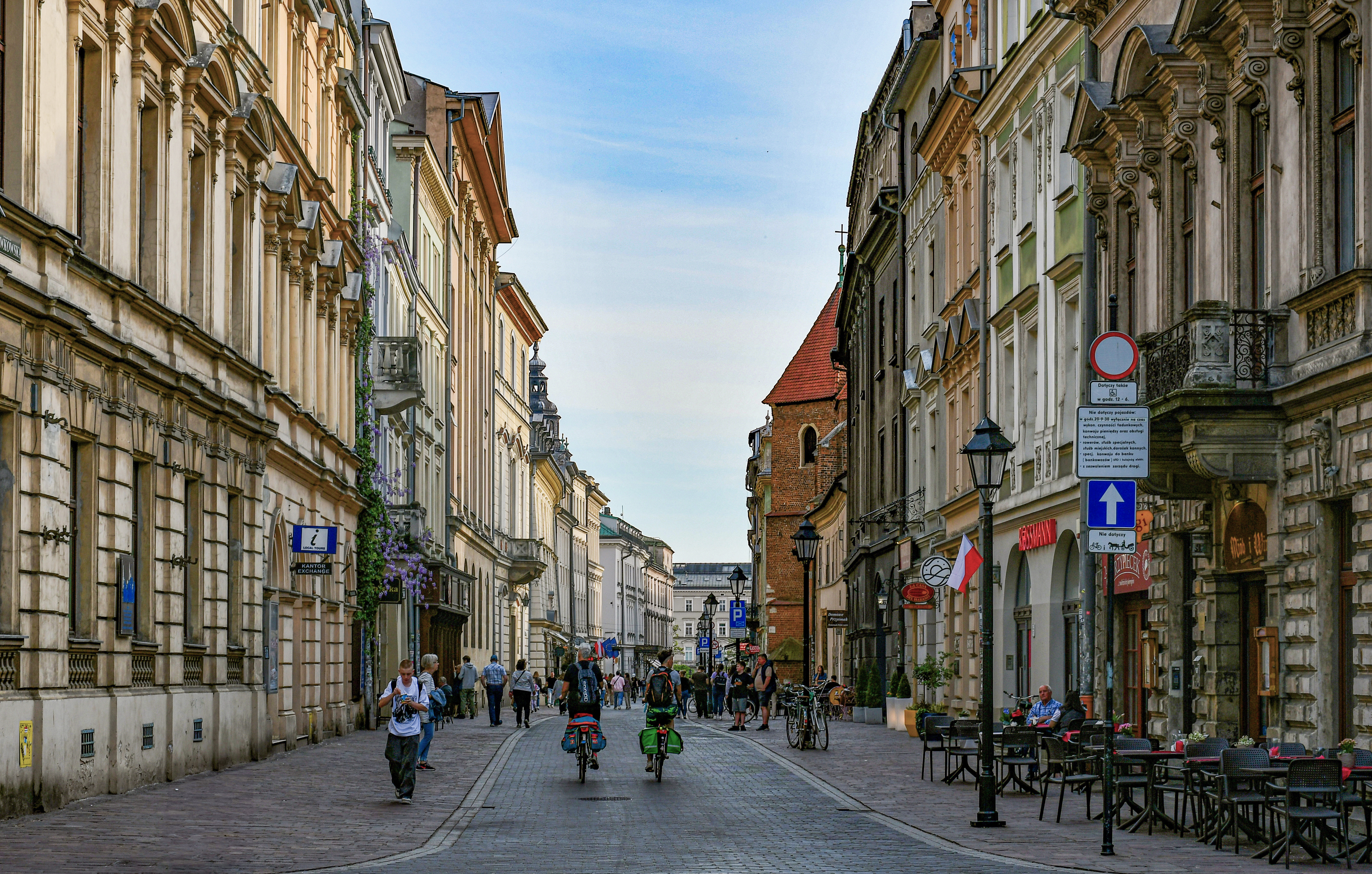
- View to the south from Planty Park.

- Length: 400 m (1,300 ft)
- South end: Main Square
- North end: Basztowa Street, Długa Street

UNESCO World Heritage Site
- Type: Cultural
- Criteria: iv
- Designated: 1978
- Part of: Historic Centre of Kraków
- Reference no.: 29
- Region: Europe and North America

Historic Monument of Poland
- Designated: 1994-09-08
- Part of: Kraków Old Town
- Reference no.: M.P. 1994 nr 50 poz. 418

Sławkowska Street (Polish: Ulica Sławkowska) - a historic street in the Old Town of Kraków, Poland. The street is a part of the old medieval route to the town of Sławków.

The oldest document recording the street's existence originates from 1307 under the name Slacovse gasse. Formerly, the northern point of the street was enclosed by the Sławkowska Gate and a bulwark. During the urban modernisation of Kraków (1817–1822), the city walls and the gatehouse were deconstructed. The street ends by the Planty Park with Basztowa Street (Ulica Basztowa, lit. Tower Street), where it continues as Długa Street (Ulica Długa, lit. Long Street).

== Features ==
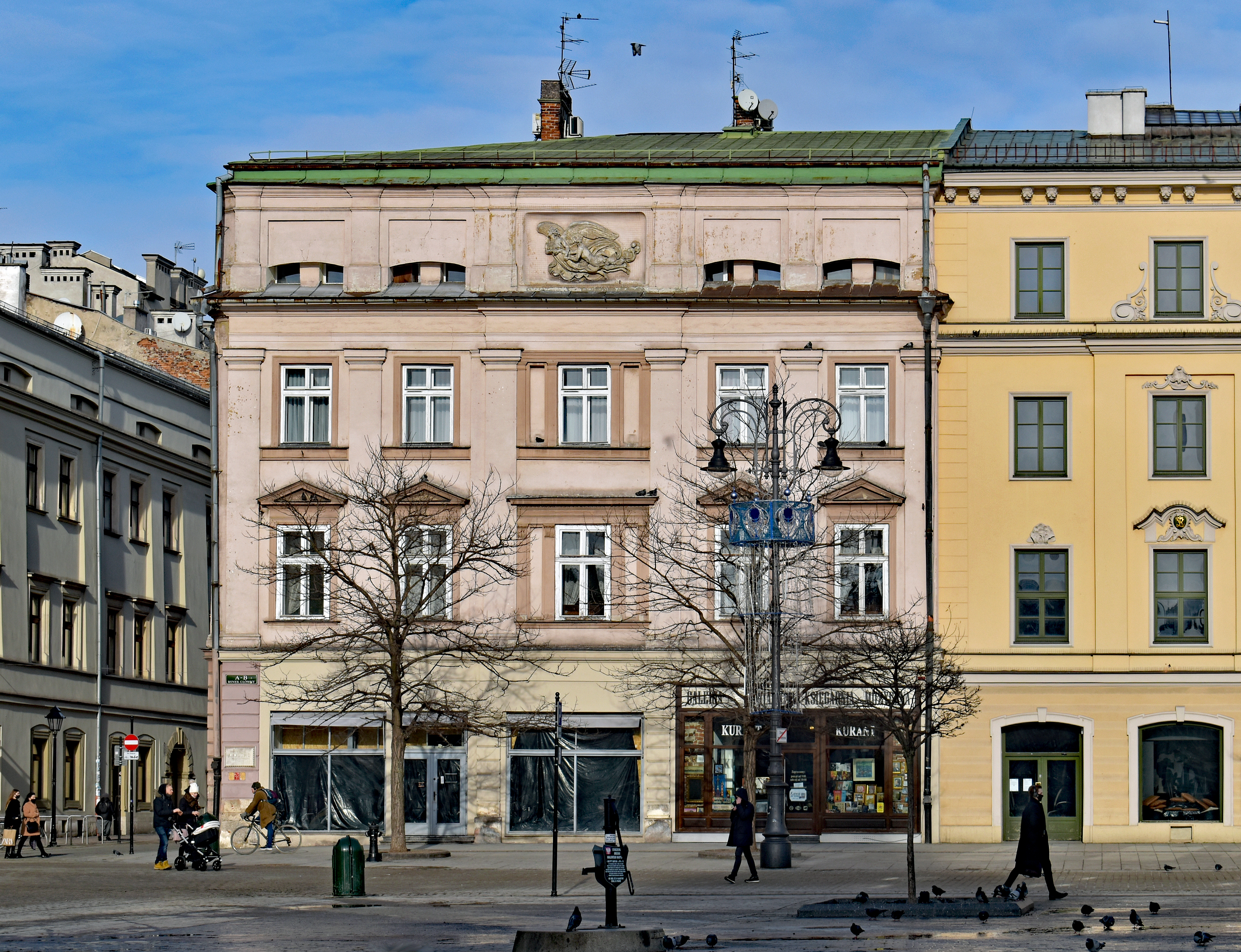
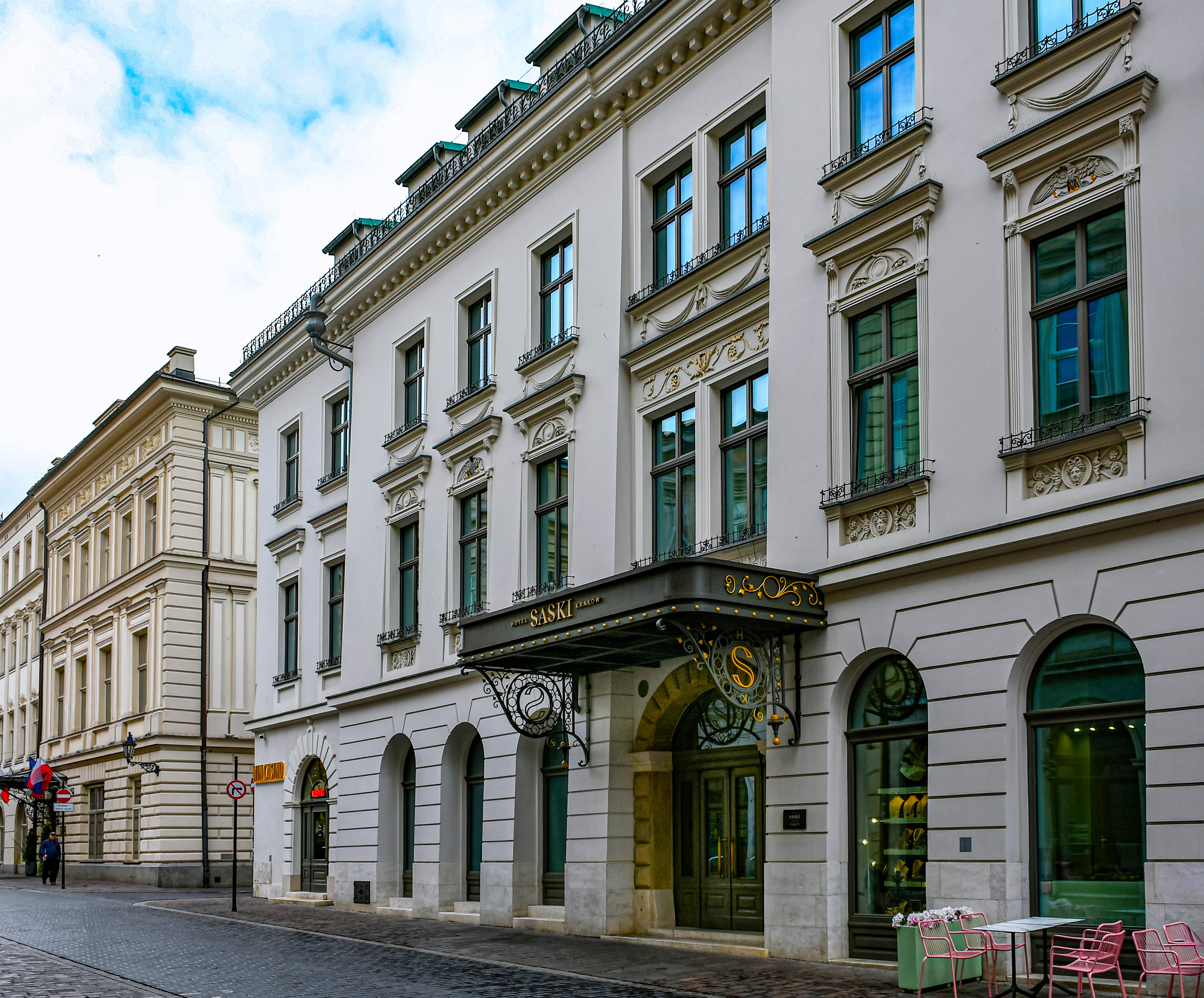
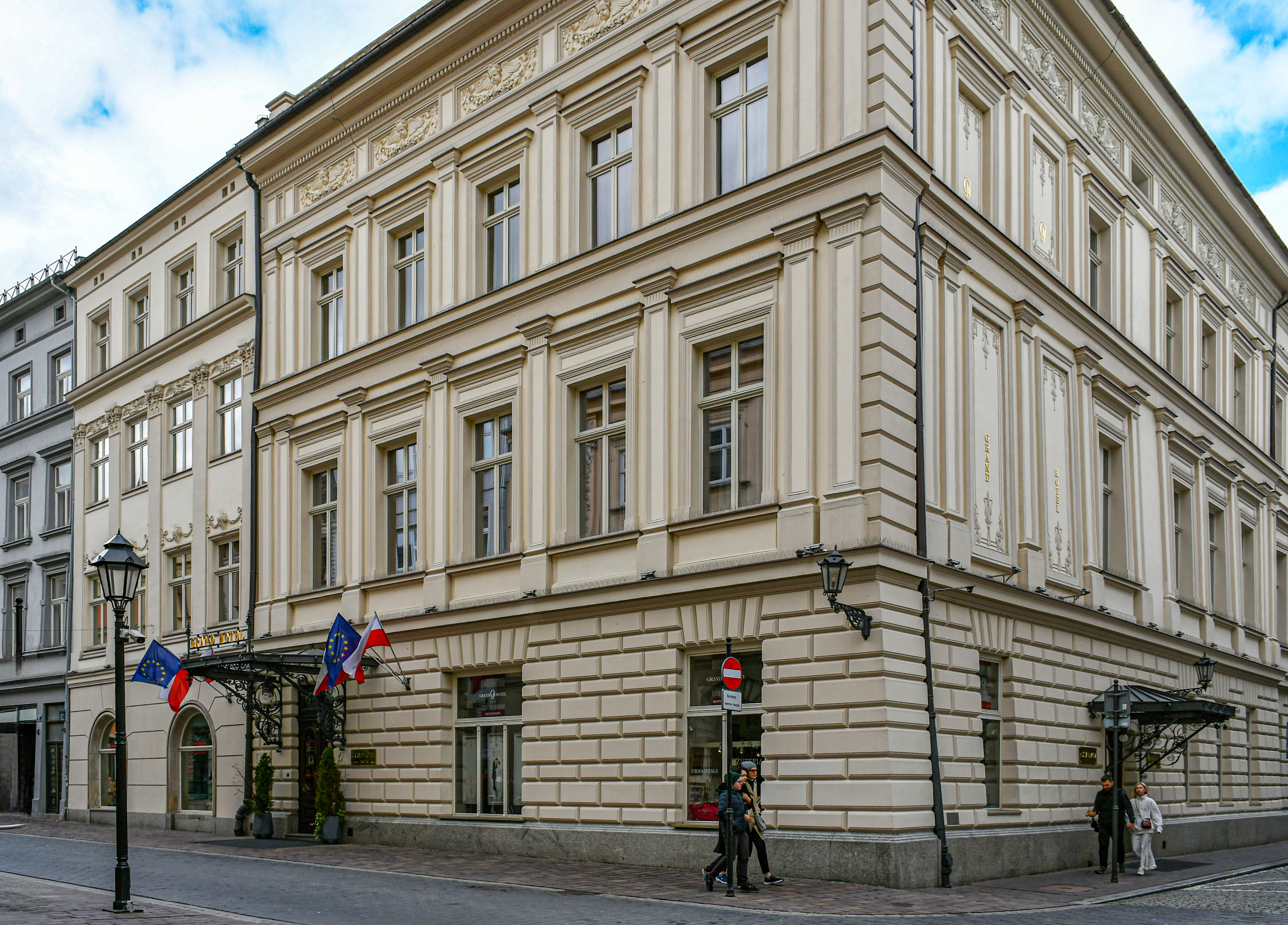
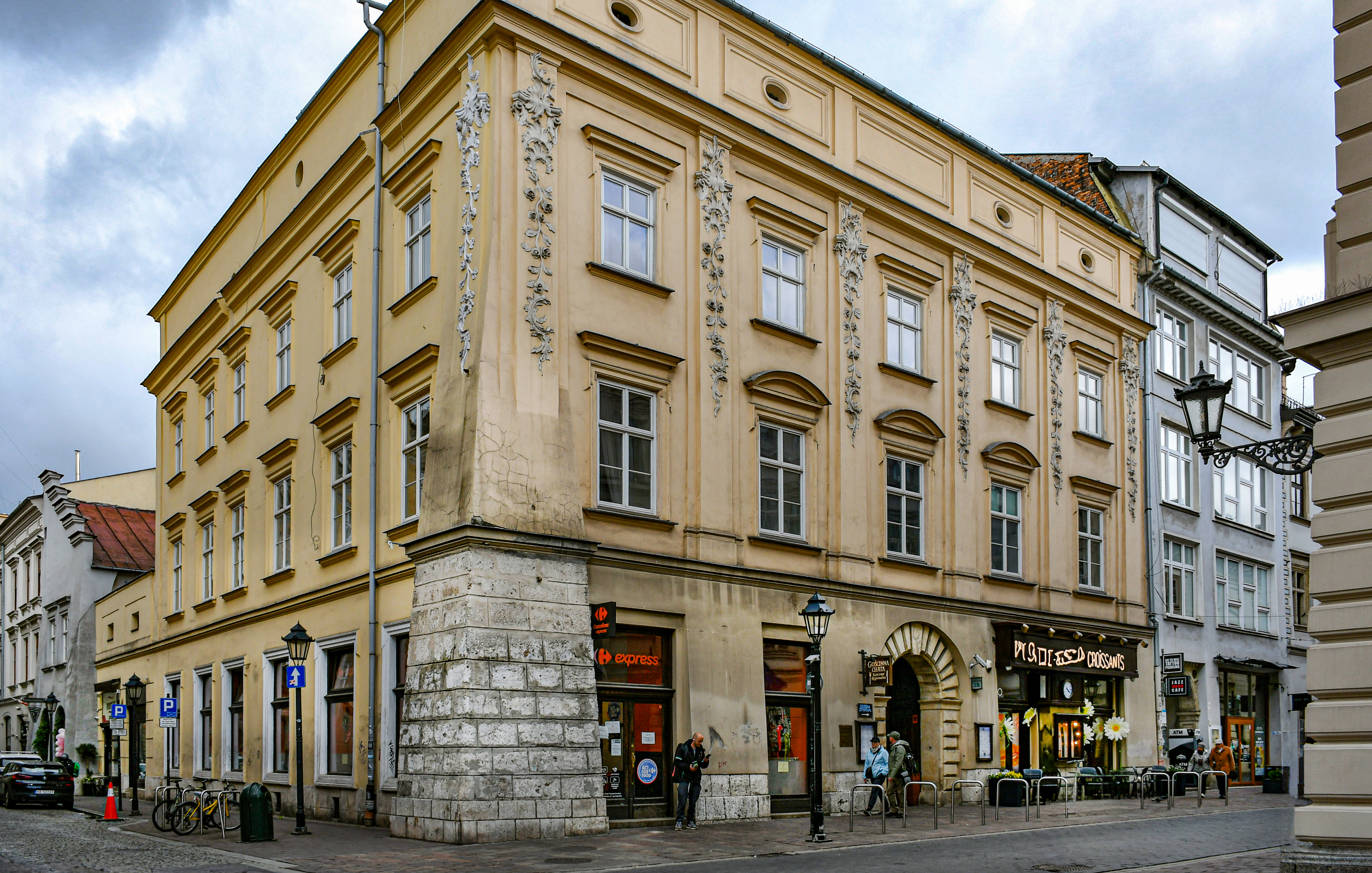
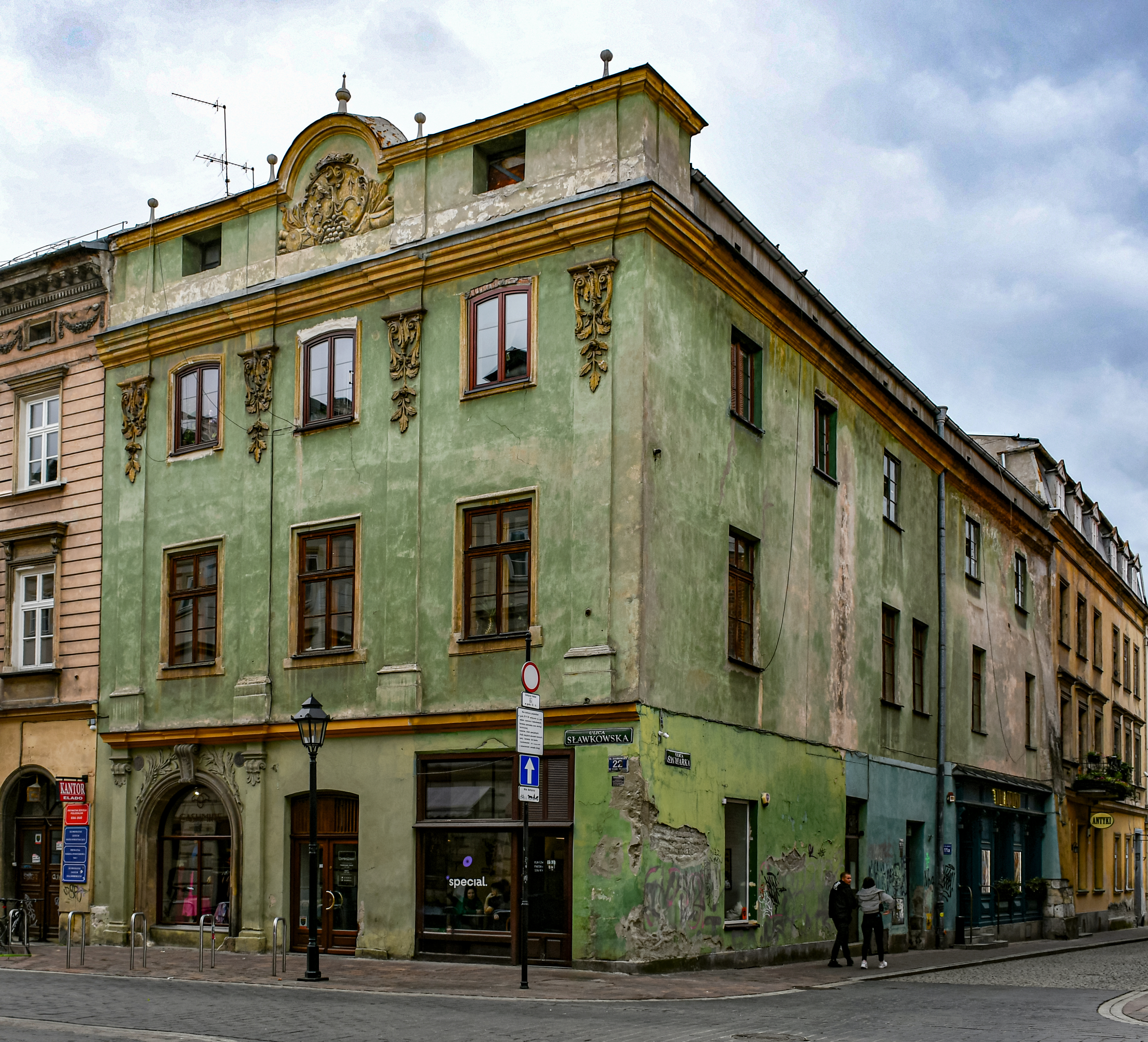
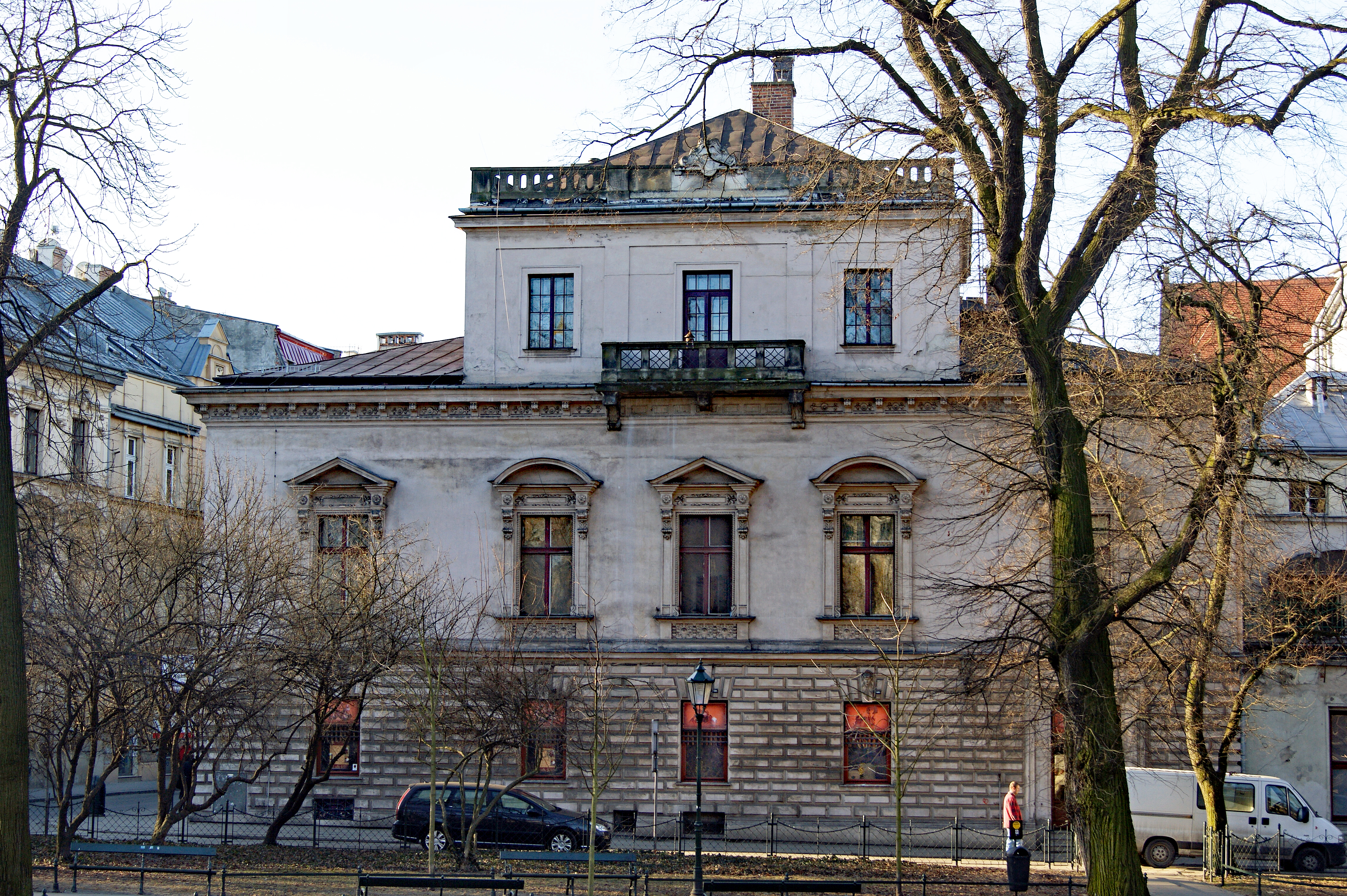
Street No.	Short description	Picture
1	Ludwikowski House - a historic townhouse built in 1776. Originally, the building housed an inn, notable guests included Johann Wolfgang von Goethe and Nicholas I of Russia.
3	Hotel Saski Kraków, Curio Collection by Hilton - built in the early nineteenth century. The building includes a concert hall, at which inter alia performed Franz Liszt, Johannes Brahms and Ignacy Jan Paderewski.
5-7	Grand Hotel - a historic 5 star hotel. The building was built in the nineteenth century in a Renaissance architectural style.
10	Badeni House - a historic townhouse built in the fourteenth century. Since 1710, the building has been owned by the Badeni aristocratic family.
22	Domżałowska (Romerowska) Tenement House - a historic townhouse built in the 14th century. Façade from the 17th century.
32	Badeni Palace - built towards the end of the nineteenth century. Presently, the palace is part of the Jagiellonian University, housing the Centre for Debt Research and Development (Centrum Badań nad Zadłużeniem i Rozwojem).

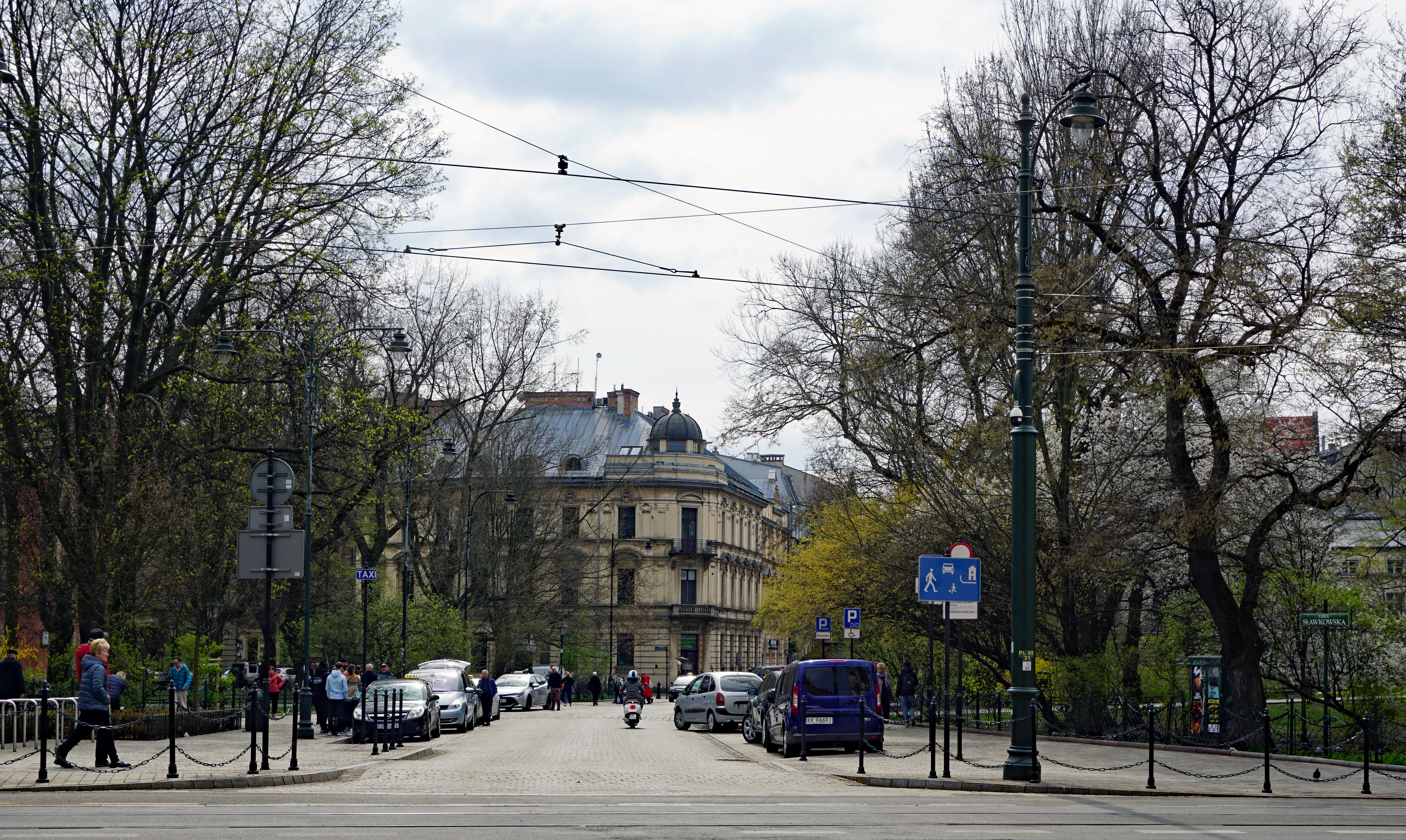
View to the south
