= 7 Świętego Krzyża Street tenement =

7 Świętego Krzyża
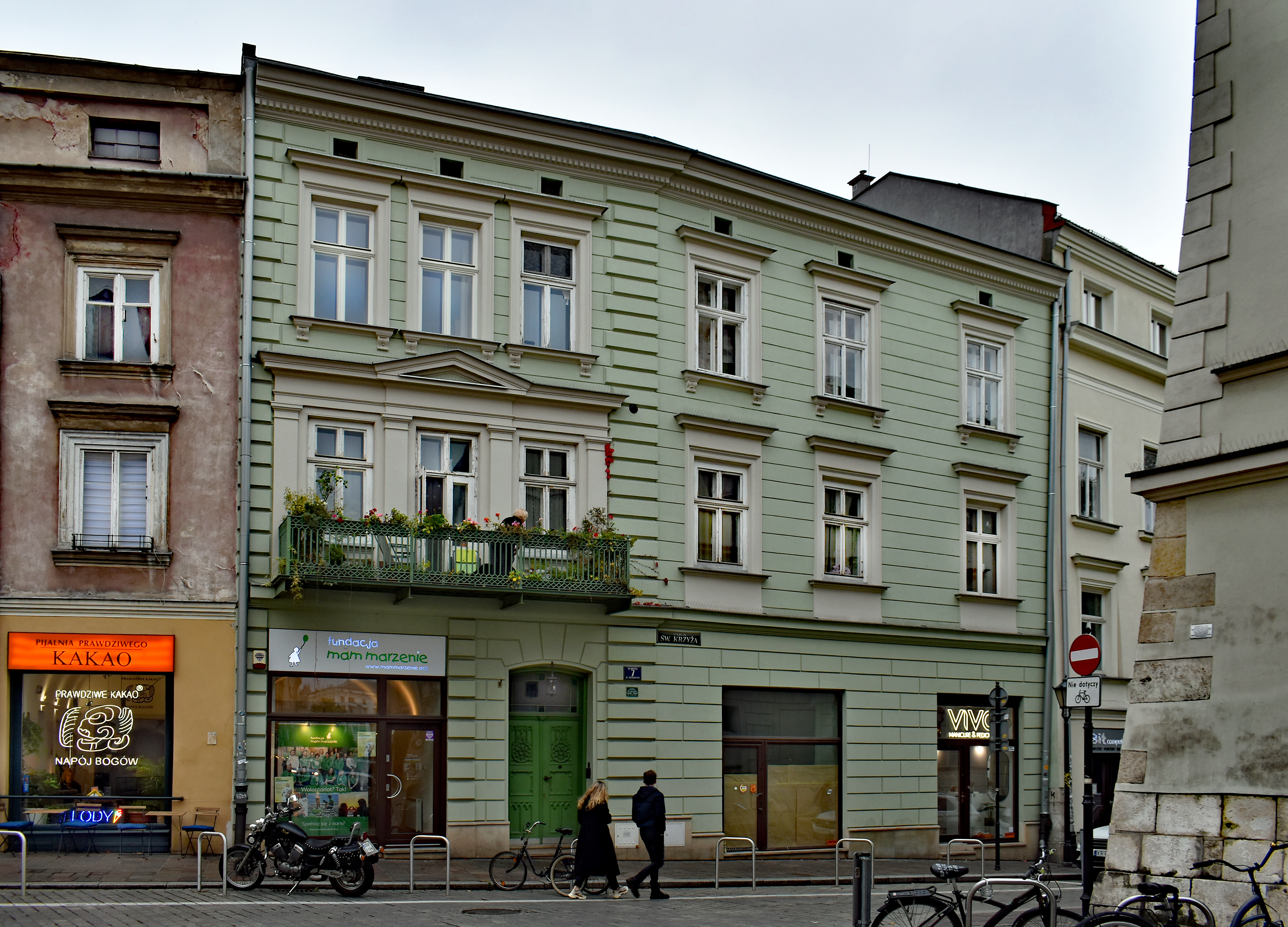

General information
- Address: 7 Świętego Krzyża Street
- Town or city: Kraków
- Country: Poland
- Coordinates: 50°03′40.0″N 19°56′31.1″E
- Completed: 16th century

7 Świętego Krzyża is a tenement house located at 7 Świętego Krzyża Street in Kraków in the District I Old Town.

== History ==
The tenement house was built in the 16th century. It was reconstructed in 1825 and 1878. Before World War I, the ground floor housed the student organization "Spójnia." In this building, on March 21, 1914, Vladimir Lenin delivered a lecture to students. Since 2005, the building has been the headquarters of the "Mam Marzenie" Foundation.

On November 6, 1990, the tenement was entered into the Registry of Cultural Property. It is also entered into the municipal register of monuments of the Lesser Poland Voivodeship.
