= Górski =

Górski (Polish pronunciation: [ˈɡurski]; feminine: Górska; plural: Górscy) is a Polish-language surname which belongs to several noble Polish families. Variants found in other countries include Gorski, Gorsky, Gurski, Gursky (phonetic from Polish with diacritics).

Language	Masculine	Feminine
Polish	Górski, Gorski	Górska, Gorska
Lithuanian	Gorskis	Gorskiene (married); Gorskyte (unmarried)
Belarusian (Romanization)	Горскі; Horski, Gorski	Горская; Horskaja, Horskaya, Horskaia, Gorskaja, Gorskaya, Gorskaia
Russian (Romanization)	Горский; Gorsky, Gorskiy, Gorskij	Горская; Gorskaya, Gorskaia, Gorskaja
Ukrainian (Romanization)	Горський; Horskyi, Horskyy, Horskyj, Gorskyi, Gorskyy, Gorskyj	Горська; Horska, Gorska

Notable people with this surname include:

== Górski or Górska ==
- Adrienne Górska (1899–1969), Polish architect
- Andrzej Górski (died 1626), Polish nobleman
- Andrzej Wincenty Górski (1920–2017), Polish chemist
- Andrzeja Górska (1917–2007), Polish Catholic nun
- Artur Górski (1970–2016), Polish politician
- Halina Górska (1898–1942), Polish communist writer
- Henryk Górski (born 1938), Polish sport shooter
- Irena Górska-Damięcka (1910–2008), Polish actress
- Jakub Górski (c. 1525–1583), Polish philosopher
- Jerzy Górski (1929–1997), Polish canoeist
- Jerzy Górski (footballer) (born 1948), Polish footballer
- Kazimierz Górski (1921–2006), Polish football manager
- Konstanty Górski (1868–1934), Polish painter
- Krzysztof Górski (born 1958), Polish footballer
- Leszek Górski (born 1961), Polish swimmer
- Maciej Górski (politician) (1944–2020), Polish diarist and politician
- Maciej Górski (footballer) (born 1990), Polish footballer
- Mateusz Górski, Polish footballer
- Małgorzata Górska, Polish activist and conservationist
- Maria Górska, birth name of Tamara de Lempicka
- Michał Górski (1911–1985), Polish cross-country skier
- Rafał Górski (1973–2010), Polish historian, writer
- Robert Górski (born 1971), Polish comedian, actor, and show creator
- Stefania Górska (1907–1986), Polish actress
- Tomasz Górski (canoeist), Polish canoeist
- Tomasz Górski (politician) (born 1973), Polish politician

== Gorski ==
- Andrea Gorski (born 1970), American basketball coach
- Andy Gorski (born 1981), English rugby player
- Bernd Gorski (born 1959), German football player and manager
- Bruno Berger-Gorski (born 1962), German opera director of Polish descent
- Chester Gorski (1906–1975), American politician from New York
- David Gorski, cancer surgeon and blogger critical of alternative medicine
- Dennis Gorski (1944–2021), American politician from New York
- Hedwig Gorski (born 1949), American poet, writer, scholar and artist
- Henry Gorski (1918–2010), American artist
- Jack Gorski (1931–2006), American reproductive biologist
- Konstanty Gorski (1859–1924), Polish composer who trained in Russia
- Mark Gorski (born 1960), American track cyclist and manager
- Martin Gorski (1886–1949), American politician
- Mijo Gorski (born 1952), Croatian Catholic prelate
- Philip S. Gorski, American sociologist
- Peter Gorski (1921–2007), German film director
- Sergey Prokudin-Gorsky (1863–1944), chemist and photographer
- Sheldon Gorski (born 1965), Canadian ice hockey coach
- Tamara Gorski, Canadian actor
- Tim Gorski, American cinematographer
- Virginia Gorski, American actress better known as Virginia Gibson

== Fictional ==
- Will Gorski, Sense8 character

== Gurski ==
- Al Gursky (born 1940), American football player
- Andreas Gursky (born 1955), German photographer
- Herbert Gursky (1930–2006), American astrophysicist
- Louisa Gurski (born 1988), athlete
- Michael Gurski (born 1979), German football player and coach
- Olga Gurski (1902–1975), Ukrainian painter
- Solomon Gursky, fictional character from Solomon Gursky Was Here
- Yulia Gurska, Ukrainian singer
- Yuri Gurski (born 1983), Belarusian entrepreneur

== Other ==
- Gorski Kotar
- Gursky's spectral tarsier
- Kazimierz Gorski Stadium
- Wólka Górska
- Wrąbczyn Górski

== See also ==
- Gorsky
- Horsky
