= Gorsky =

Gorsky (Russian: Горский), Gorskaya (feminine; Горская), or Gorskoye (neuter; Горское) may refer to:

== Places ==
- Gorsky (rural locality) (Gorskaya, Gorskoye), name of several rural localities in Russia
- Gorskaya railway station, a locality and train station in Sestroretsk, St. Petersburg, Russia
- Gorskoye (Hirske), the Russian name for a city in Luhansk, Ukraine

== Other uses ==
- Gorsky (surname)
- Good luck, Mr. Gorsky, an urban legend about the Apollo 11 Moon landing

== See also ==
- Górski, Polish surname
