= Students Leaving Krakow in 1549 =

1892 painting by Jan Matejko

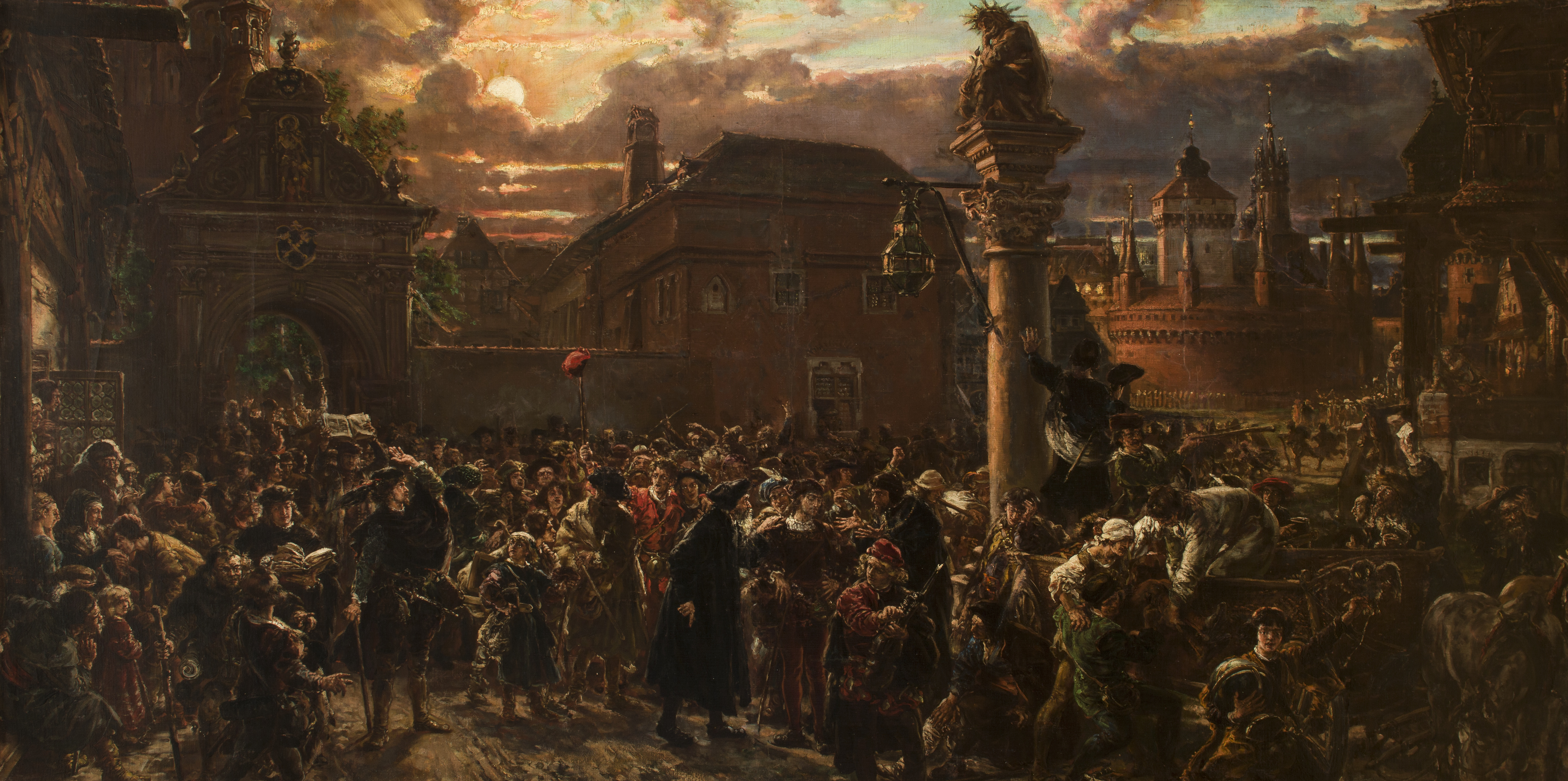
Students Leaving Krakow in 1549 (1892) by Jan Matejko

Students Leaving Krakow in 1549 (Wyjście żaków z Krakowa w roku 1549) is an oil painting painted by Jan Matejko in the autumn of 1892 in Krzesławice during a health stay in a country manor belonging to the artist's family. The painting is in the collection of the National Museum in Krakow and is exhibited in the Jan Matejko House on Floriańska Street.

== Description of the painting ==
On the canvas, Matejko depicted Kleparski Square, filled with crowds of people. In the background, the buildings of Krakow, flooded with the light of the rising sun, are shown: on the right, the Barbican, St. Florian's Gate and in the distance, the towers of St. Mary's Church, on the left, behind the gate there is the silhouette of the university collegiate church of St. Florian. The center of the composition is the Monastery of the Spirits with the most valuable, Gothic part of the walls.

The event presented by Jan Matejko was the result of a clash that took place on 14 May 1549 in Krakow, between students of the Krakow Academy and the armed servants of the priest canon Andrzej Czarnkowski. The servants attacked the student dormitory of All Saints, which they destroyed and injured the students, and even killed one student (a certain Jerzy, son of Jan from Pieniany). The case, through the intercession of King Sigismund Augustus, was brought to court, but the trial was not conducted impartially. Some of the outraged students decided to leave Krakow and move to other universities. The artist painted the moment when students left Krakow in droves. "The painting with a large group of crowding figures is in browns and yellows with accents of red and dark green".

== The history of the painting ==
Students leaving Krakow, as a late work by Jan Matejko, did not attract much interest from researchers, being primarily associated with the backstage of the presented event. In 1882, while staying in Krzesławice due to his health condition, Matejko did not abandon his work in the Committee for the Restoration of the Sigismund Chapel, he supervised the progress of the works and participated in the committee meetings. The Spirit monastery with a Gothic part of the walls, located in the center of the composition, was the subject of a dispute between the city authorities and the architectural and conservation circles at the end of the 19th century, in which Matejko was also involved. The conflict began in the summer of 1886, when, contrary to the recommendation of the theater commission, the location of the new building of the municipal theater was indicated in the garden of St. Ducha, where the complex of the former hospice and monastery of the Krakow house of the Canons of the Holy Spirit de Saxia was located. Kraków experienced a long-awaited boom, but it still faced severe restrictions and a shortage of land from the Austrian side. For this reason, the Krakow authorities were forced to implement construction projects in the Old Town area, at the expense of liquidating historic parts.

The students' departure from Krakow is the artist's response to the growing conflict and the unsuccessful attempt to save the building. After the destruction of the remains of the building of St. Ducha, President Feliks Szlachtowski presented one of the letters sent by Matejko at an open meeting: "Given the dismissal I received from the excellent Krakow City Council, the title of honorary citizenship, given to me ten years ago, is not in line with what has happened in recent days and has been going on for a long time, it compels me to return the diploma that I am currently submitting".

The next paragraphs discussed, among others, Matejko's decision that Kraków would not see his next paintings in the following years, and the Constitution of 3 May 1791, will be the last work exhibited in the city. The last paragraph was kept secret by the president: "Please believe: it is not anger, but an involuntary resentment towards my hometown that causes me. I do not curse those who have affected me the most with bad will (I cannot take it otherwise)... because they are vile! Liberals, who sit on the council today, mean everything, manage everything, will go, I warn you - they will continue... they will sweep away old rubbish, as they used to do in the Wawel church, because they will always find slow appraisers who, contrary to their own beliefs (because they are considered mindless I cannot believe), they consider the walls impossible and collapsing! If only these gentlemen, in the last hour, found Christ more merciful to themselves than they showed and still show respect for the venerable walls of old Krakow! In Krakow, on 23 May 1892, Jan Matejko".

Following the decision, similarly to other paintings from this period, the artist did not show them in Krakow; they could only be seen at the posthumous exhibition held at the National Museum in Krakow in 1893. Then the heirs sold the painting. Before 1901 it belonged to Karol Szlenker from Warsaw. Later, it changed ownership many times, in 1938, during the exhibition of the Society for the Encouragement of Fine Arts, it was owned by the American Bank in Poland, and on the eve of World War II, it was transferred to the National Museum in Krakow (the object's scientific card states that it was purchased on 9 May 1939 for PLN 12,500 from Henryk Wąsikiewicz).

Due to poor storage during the German occupation, it was irreversibly damaged and, despite conservation works, the original color intensity could not be restored.
