= Goresky =

Goresky is a surname. Notable people with the surname include:

- Carl Goresky (1932–1996), Canadian physician and researcher
- Isidore Goresky (1902–1999), Canadian farm laborer, teacher, and provincial politician
- Mark Goresky (born 1950), Canadian mathematician

== See also ==
- Gorsky (disambiguation)
