= Expulsion of Poles by Germany =

19th century to 1945 German campaign of ethnic cleansing against Poles and Polish Jews

Expulsions of Poles by Germany
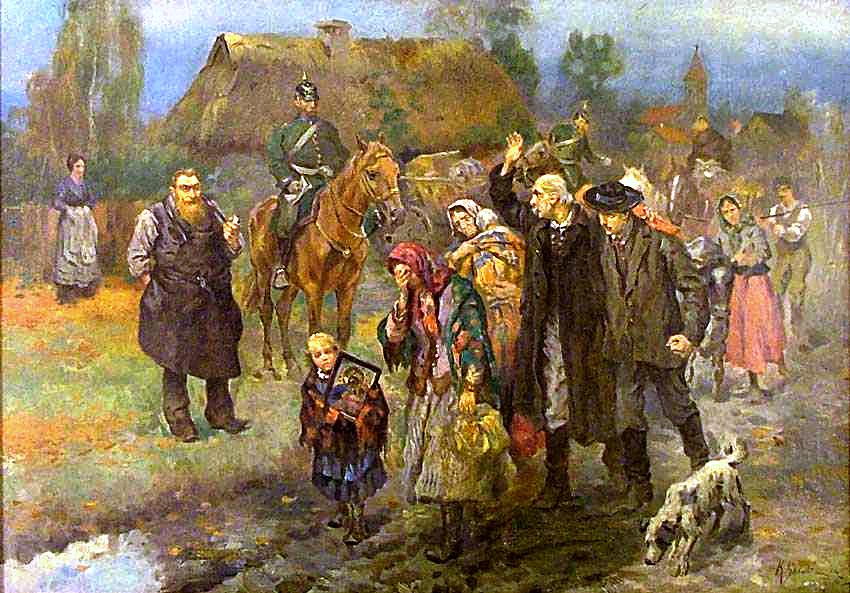
- Prussian deportations of 1885–1890 as shown on a contemporary painting by Konstanty Górski

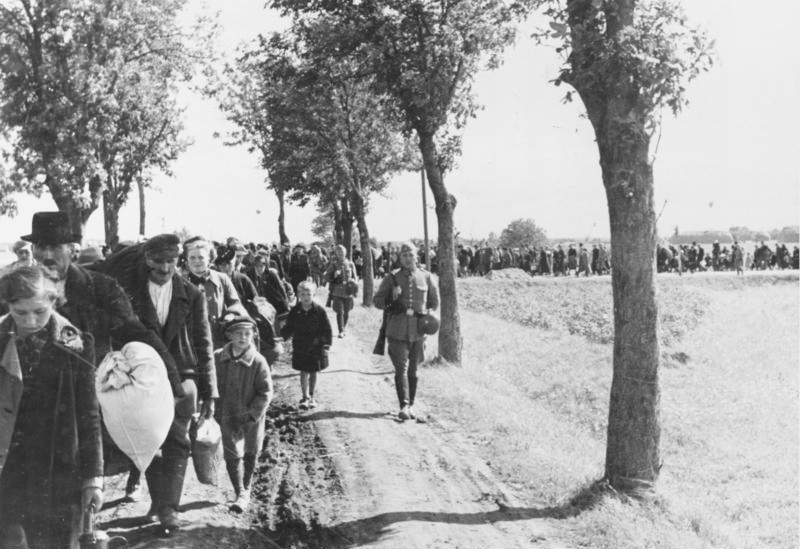
- Expulsion of Poles from Reichsgau Wartheland following the Invasion of Poland (1939). Families led to the trains under German escort, as part of Nazi German ethnic cleansing of annexed Poland.
- Duration: Partitions of Poland (Invasion of Poland) World War II
- Location: German-controlled territories in Poland and Eastern Europe
- Type: Genocide, Ethnic cleansing, forced migration, Mass Expulsion
- Cause: Lebensraum, anti-Polish sentiment, Germanisation
- Patron(s): Frederick the Great, Otto von Bismarck, Adolf Hitler and the Nazi Party
- Outcome: Expulsion of 325,000 ethnic Poles

The expulsion of Poles by Germany was a series of forced displacements, deportations, and ethnic cleansing campaigns targeting Polish populations by German authorities, particularly during the 20th century. These actions occurred primarily during two key periods: under Nazi Germany during World War II, and earlier during the German Empire’s nationalist policies.

The partitions of Poland had ended the existence of a sovereign Polish state in the 18th century. With the rise of German nationalism in the mid-19th century, Ethnic Poles faced increasing discrimination on formerly Polish lands. While the German Empire had refrained from expelling the Polish population that had German citizenship, it deported 30.000 Poles that had immigrated to Germany from the Russian Empire.

During the Nazi occupation (1939–1945), hundreds of thousands of Poles were forcibly removed from annexed territories and sent to the General Government as part of Generalplan Ost, the Nazi strategy for the colonization and Germanization of Eastern Europe.

== Background ==
Ethnic Poles had constituted one of the largest minorities in the German Empire since its creation in 1871. This was a result of earlier acquisitions of Polish inhabited regions made by Prussia, the state that initiated the Unification of Germany.

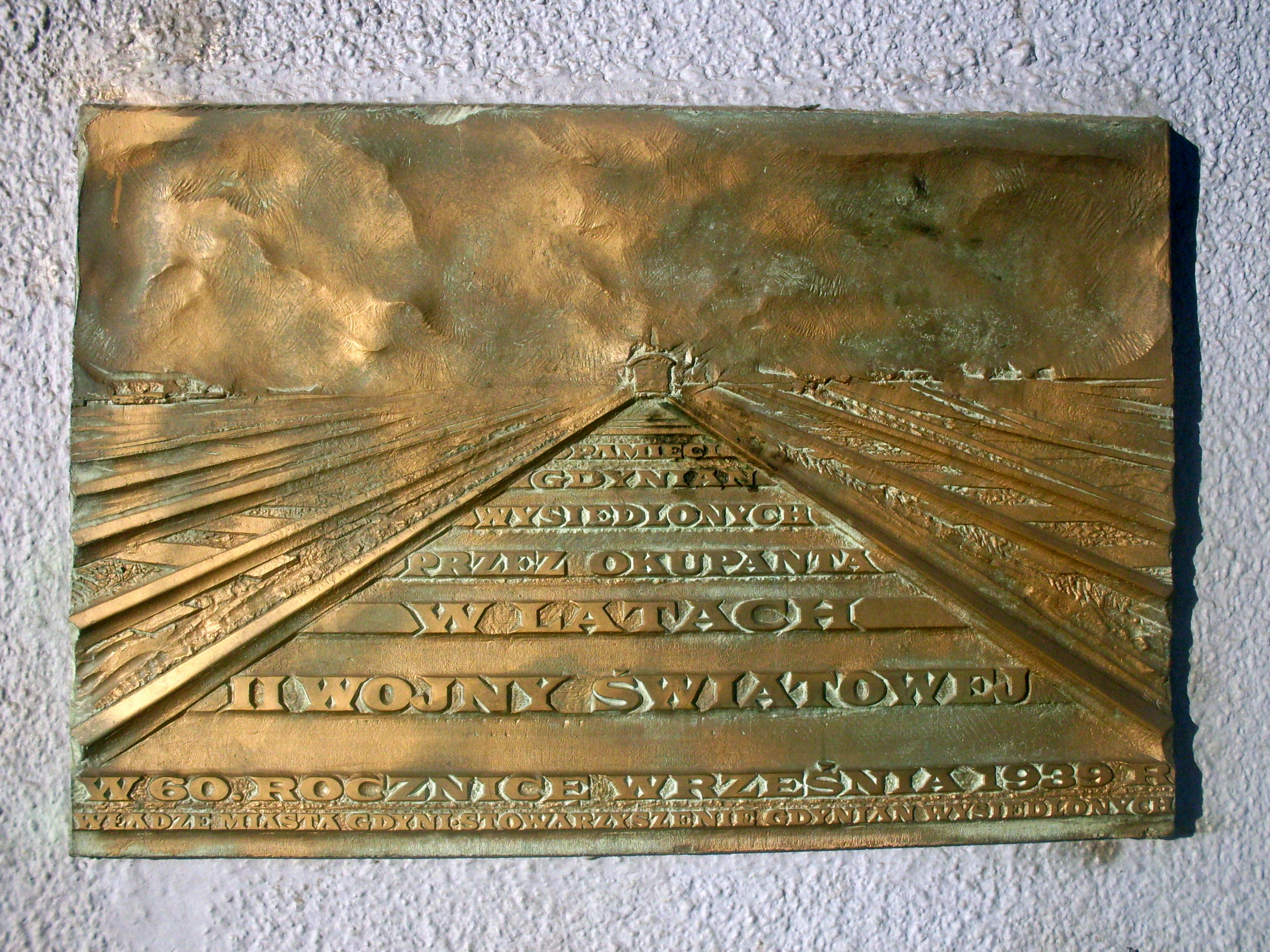
Plaque commemorating the expulsion of 50,000 Polish citizens of Gdynia during the German "aktion Gotenhafen" in World War II

The idea of pan-Germanism, demanding the unification of all Ethnic Germans in one state, including the German diaspora east of the imperial border, grew out of Romantic nationalism. Some pan-Germanists believed that Germans were ethnically superior to other peoples — including Slavs, whom they viewed as "inferior" to the German race and culture. The Nazi concept of Lebensraum in turn had demanded "living space" for the German people, claiming the overpopulation of Germany and alleged negative traits of heavy urbanisation in contrast to agricultural settlement. The desired territories were to be taken particularly from Poland. Both pan-Germanism and Lebensraum theory viewed Poles as an obstacle to German hegemony and prosperity as well as future expansion of the German state.

== German Empire ==
In the territories annexed during the Partitions of Poland, German authorities sought to limit the number of ethnic Poles by their forced Germanisation and by a wave of settlement by German colonists. Beginning with the Kulturkampf, laws were enacted to restrict Polish culture, religion, language, and rights to property. Bismarck initiated the Prussian deportations of 1885–1890, which affected some 30,000 immigrant Poles and Jews living in Germany who did not have German citizenship and were forced to return to their country of origin. This is described by E.J. Feuchtwanger as one of the precedents to modern policies of ethnic cleansing. In 1887 Bernhard von Bülow, the future Chancellor of the German Empire, advocated expelling Poles by force from territories which were Polish-inhabited and slated to become part of Germany.

In 1908, Germany legalized the eviction of Poles from their properties under pressure from pan-German nationalist groups who hoped this law would be used to reduce the number of Poles in the East. This law however was only used once, due to its controversial nature.

== World War I ==
In August 1914 the German imperial army bombed and burned down the city of Kalisz, chasing out tens of thousands of its Polish citizens. However, during World War I, Germany had a frantic need for extra manpower in the East and hoped to tap into the reservoir of military volunteers among the Poles by making promises of a future independent Polish state. This initiative (led by Bethmann) failed, producing only "a dribble of volunteers" in 1916, but it was a commitment very hard to retract. There were numerous mistakes made, such as the Oath Crisis, caused by poor wording of the oath of the Polish soldiers, which caused consternation among many Polish volunteers. In general, opinions of the German occupiers were mixed, between those who hoped that the Germans would set up a new Polish state, and those who feared German domination. In any case, successful attacks by the Russian army, such as the 'Brusilov offensive', forced Germany to consider a quasi independent buffer state between the two empires, hopefully set up only in the former Russian Poland and linked to Germany by its own military means. The idea of reconstituting Congress Poland for the Poles after the war, was a cynical ploy which stemmed from a desire to push Russia's frontiers further East with the least amount of German effort. In reality, Germany planned to annex about 30,000 km^{2} from former Congress Poland for German colonisation. Most of the Polish and Jewish populations of those territories (about 3,000,000 people) was to be expelled into a small Polish puppet state. The remaining population was to be used as agricultural labour for new German colonists.

== World War II ==
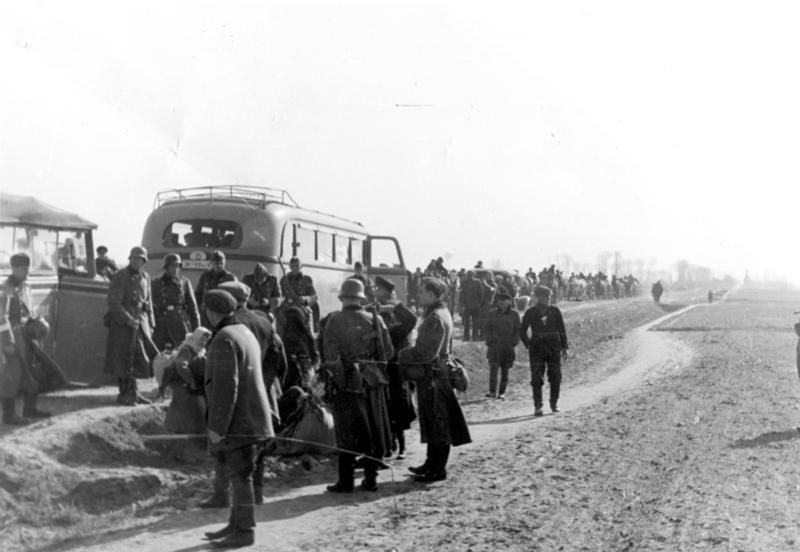
Expulsion of 280,606 Poles from Reichsgau Wartheland annexed to the Reich

With the occupation of Poland following the German invasion of the country, Nazi policies were enacted upon its Polish population on an unprecedented scale. According to Nazi ideology Poles, as Untermenschen, were seen as fit only for slavery and for further elimination in order to make room for the Germans. Adolf Hitler had plans for extensive colonisation of territories in the east of the Third Reich. Poland, itself, would – according to well documented German plans – have been cleared of Polish people altogether, as 20 million or so would have been expelled eventually. Up to 3 or 4 million Polish citizens (all peasants) believed to be descendants of German colonists and migrants and therefore considered "racially valuable" would be Germanised and dispersed among the German population. Nazi leadership hoped that through expulsions to Siberia, famine, mass executions, and slave labour of any survivors, the Polish nation would be eventually completely destroyed.

World War II expulsions took place within two specific territories: one area annexed to Reich in 1939 and 1941, and another, the General Government, precursor to further expansion of German administrative settlement area. Eventually, as Adolf Hitler explained in March 1941, the General Government would be cleared of Poles, the region would be turned into a "purely German area" within 15–20 years and in place of 15 million Poles, 4–5 million Germans would live there, and the area would become "as German as the Rhineland.

=== Expulsions from Polish territories annexed by Nazi Germany ===
The Nazi plan to ethnically cleanse the territories occupied by Germany in Eastern Europe during World War II, was called the Generalplan Ost (GPO). Germanisation began with the classification of people suitable as defined on the Nazi Volksliste. About 1.7 million Poles were deemed Germanizable, including between one and two hundred thousand children who were taken from their parents. For the rest, expulsion was carried out.

These expulsions were carried out so abruptly that ethnic Germans being resettled there were given homes with half-eaten meals on tables and unmade beds where small children had been sleeping at the time of expulsion. Members of Hitler Youth and the League of German Girls were assigned the task of overseeing such evictions to ensure that the Poles left behind most of their belongings for the use of the settlers. According to Czesław Łuczak, Germans expelled the following numbers of Poles from territories annexed to the Reich in the period of 1939–1944:

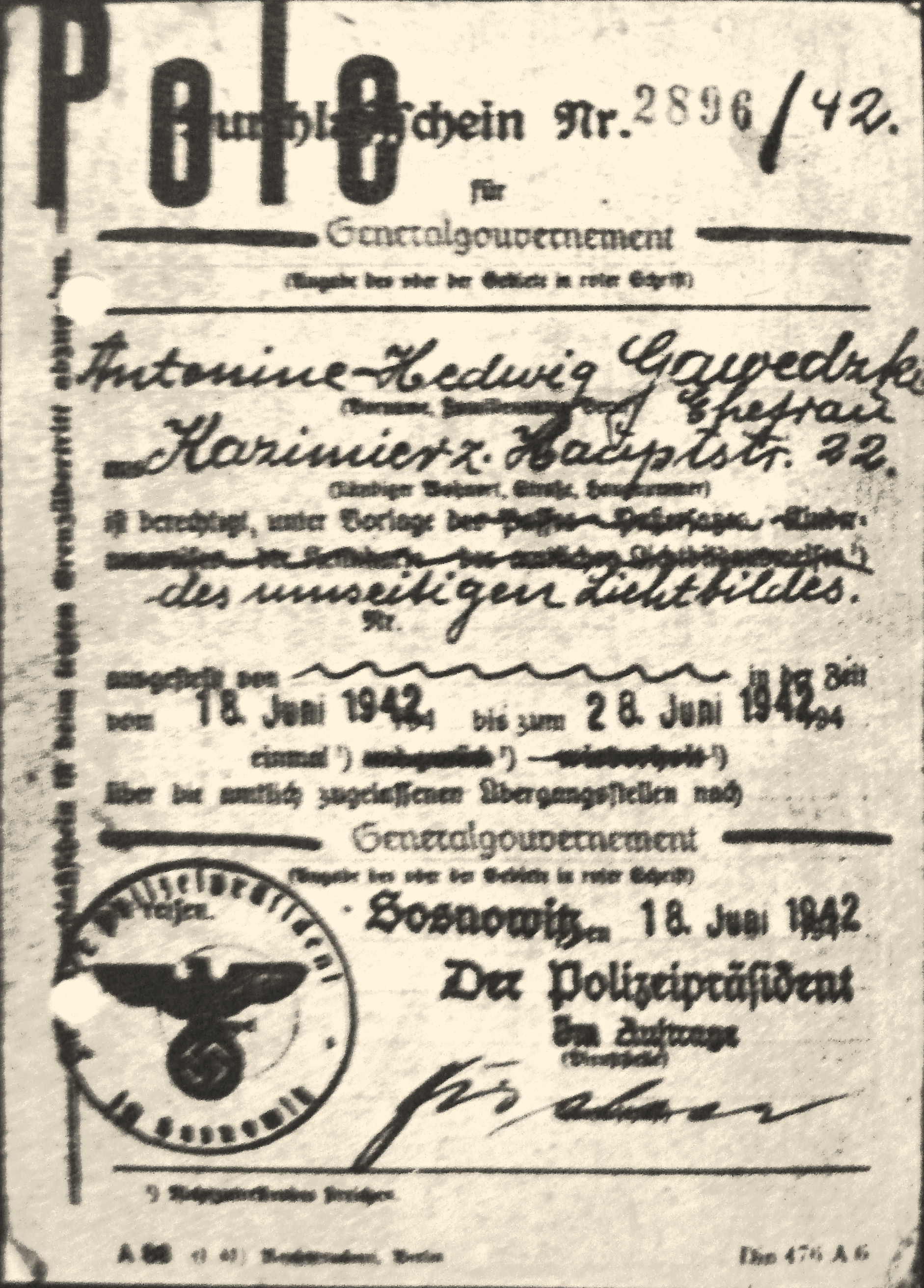
Expulsion Warrant from Sosnowiec 1942 with stamp Pole.

Expulsion of Poles by Nazi Germany 1939–1944
Name of territory	Number of displaced Poles
Warthegau region	630,000
Silesia	81,000
Pomerelia	124,000
Białystok	28,000
Ciechanów	25,000
So called "Wild expulsions" of 1939 (Pomerelia mostly)	30,000 – 40,000
Polish areas annexed by Nazi Germany (total)	918,000 – 928,000
Zamość region	100,000 – 110,000
General Government	171,000
Warsaw (after Warsaw Uprising)	500,000
Grand total, on all occupied Polish territories	1,689,000 – 1,709,000

Combined with "wild expulsions", in four years 923,000 Poles were ethnically cleansed from territories Germany annexed into the Reich.

=== Expulsions from General Government ===
Within the territories of the German protectorate called General Government there were two main areas of expulsions committed by the German state. The protectorate itself was seen as temporary measure, and served as a concentration camp for Poles to perform hard labour furthering German industry and war effort. Eventually it was to be cleared of Poles also.

==== Zamość ====
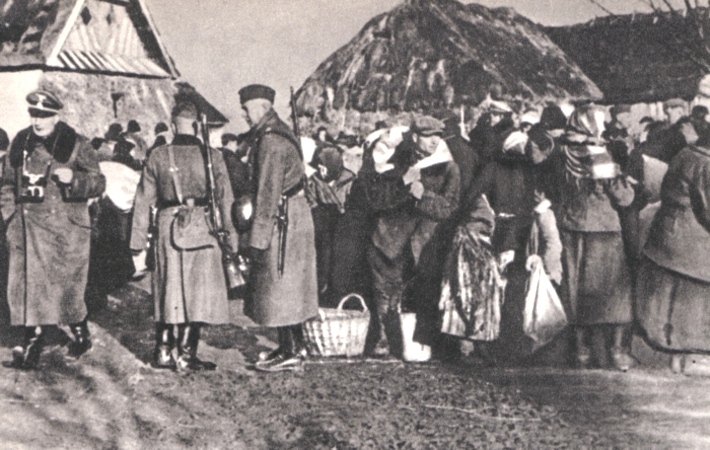
Expulsion of Poles from villages in Zamość Region by SS, December 1942

Some 116,000 Poles were expelled from the Zamość region as part of Nazi plans for establishment of German colonies in the conquered territories. Zamość itself was to be renamed Himmlerstadt, later changed to Pflugstadt (Plough City), which was to symbolise the German "Plow" that was to "plough" the East. Additionally, almost 30,000 children were kidnapped by German authorities from their parents for potential Germanisation. This led to massive resistance (see Zamość Uprising).

==== Warsaw ====
In October 1940, 115,000 Poles were expelled from their homes in central Warsaw to make room for the Jewish Ghetto, constructed there by German authorities. (Jews were then expelled from their homes elsewhere and forced to move into the Ghetto.) When the Warsaw Uprising failed, 500,000 people were expelled from the city alone as punishment by German authorities.

== Demographic estimates ==
It is estimated that between 1.6 and 2 million people were expelled from their homes during the German occupation of Poland. The Nazi German organized expulsions—by themselves—affected 1,710,000 Poles directly. New estimates by Polish historians give the number of 2.478 million people expelled. Additionally, 2.5 to 3 million Poles were taken from Poland to Germany as slave labourers to support the Nazi war effort. These numbers do not include people arrested by the Germans and sent to Nazi concentration camps.

In many instances, Poles were given between 15 minutes and 1 hour to collect their personal belongings (usually no more than 15 kilograms per person) before they were removed from their homes and transported east (see: deportations) On top of that about 5 million Poles were sent to German labor and concentration camps. A total of about 6 million Polish citizens were killed during the war, of which approximately half were Jews or of Jewish descent. All these actions resulted in significant changes in Polish demographics at the end of the war.

== See also ==
- Drang nach Osten (Drive towards the East)
- Expulsion of Germans after World War II
- Generalplan Ost, Hitler's "new order of ethnographical relations"
- Lebensraum (Living space), the primary political concept used by the Nazis to "justify" the conquest of territory in Poland and Eastern Europe
- Nazi propaganda
- Pacification operations in German-occupied Poland
- Prussian deportations of Poles and Jews in 1885-1890
- Repatriation of Poles (1944–1946)
- World War II evacuation and expulsion
- Chronicles of Terror

== Bibliography ==
1. Maria Rutowska, "Wysiedlenia ludności polskiej z Kraju Warty do Generalnego Gubernatorstwa 1939-1941" Instytut Zachodni, Poznań 2003,ISBN 83-87688-42-8
2. Czesław Łuczak, Polityka ludnościowa i ekonomiczna hitlerowskich Niemiec w okupowanej Polsce, Wyd. Poznańskie, Poznań 1979 ISBN 83-210-0010-X
3. Czesław Łuczak, "Położenie ludności polskiej w Kraju Warty 1939 - 1945", Wydawnictwo Poznańskie 1987
4. Czesław Madajczyk, Generalny Plan Wschodni: Zbiór dokumentów, Główna Komisja Badania Zbrodni Hitlerowskich w Polsce, Warsaw, 1990
5. Czesław Madajczyk, Generalna Gubernia w planach hitlerowskich. Studia, PWN, Warsaw. 1961
6. Czesław Madajczyk, Polityka III Rzeszy w okupowanej Polsce, Warsaw, 1970
7. Andrzej Leszek Szcześniak, Plan Zagłady Słowian. Generalplan Ost, Polskie Wydawnictwo Encyklopedyczne, Radom, 2001
8. Piotr Szubarczyk (IPN Gdańsk), "Umacnianie niemczyzny" na polskim Pomorzu, Nasz Dziennik, 03.09.2009
9. L. Chrzanowski, "Wypędzenia z Pomorza," Biuletyn Instytutu Pamięci Narodowej”, 2004, nr 5 (40), ss. 34 – 48.
10. W. Jastrzębski, Potulice. Hitlerowski obóz przesiedleńczy i pracy, Bydgoszcz 1967.
