= Gorsky (rural locality) =

Gorsky (Russian: Горский; masculine), Gorskaya (Горская; feminine), or Gorskoye (Горское; neuter) is the name of several rural localities in Russia:

- Gorsky, Arkhangelsk Oblast, a vyselok in Rostovsky Selsoviet of Ustyansky District of Arkhangelsk Oblast
- Gorsky, Krasnodar Krai, a settlement in Tbilissky Rural Okrug of Tbilissky District of Krasnodar Krai
- Gorsky, Rostov Oblast, a khutor in Nikolayevskoye Rural Settlement of Konstantinovsky District of Rostov Oblast
- Gorsky, Samara Oblast, a settlement in Bogatovsky District of Samara Oblast
- Gorsky, Volgograd Oblast, a khutor in Dobrinsky Selsoviet of Uryupinsky District of Volgograd Oblast
- Gorskoye, Krasnodar Krai, a selo under the administrative jurisdiction of Dzhugbsky Settlement Okrug, Tuapsinsky District, Krasnodar Krai
- Gorskoye, Leningrad Oblast, a logging depot settlement under the administrative jurisdiction of Kamennogorskoye Settlement Municipal Formation, Vyborgsky District, Leningrad Oblast
- Gorskoye, Pskov Oblast, a village in Ostrovsky District of Pskov Oblast
- Gorskoye, Tula Oblast, a village in Mikhaylovskaya Volost of Kurkinsky District of Tula Oblast
- Gorskaya, Arkhangelsk Oblast, a village in Ust-Padengsky Selsoviet of Shenkursky District of Arkhangelsk Oblast
- Gorskaya, Republic of Karelia, a village in Medvezhyegorsky District of the Republic of Karelia
- Gorskaya, Krasnoyarsk Krai, a village in Verkhnepashinsky Selsoviet of Yeniseysky District of Krasnoyarsk Krai
- Gorskaya, Perm Krai, a village in Permsky District of Perm Krai
