= Jan Matejko House =

Museum of the Polish painter Jan Matejko, Kraków

- Dom Jana Matejki
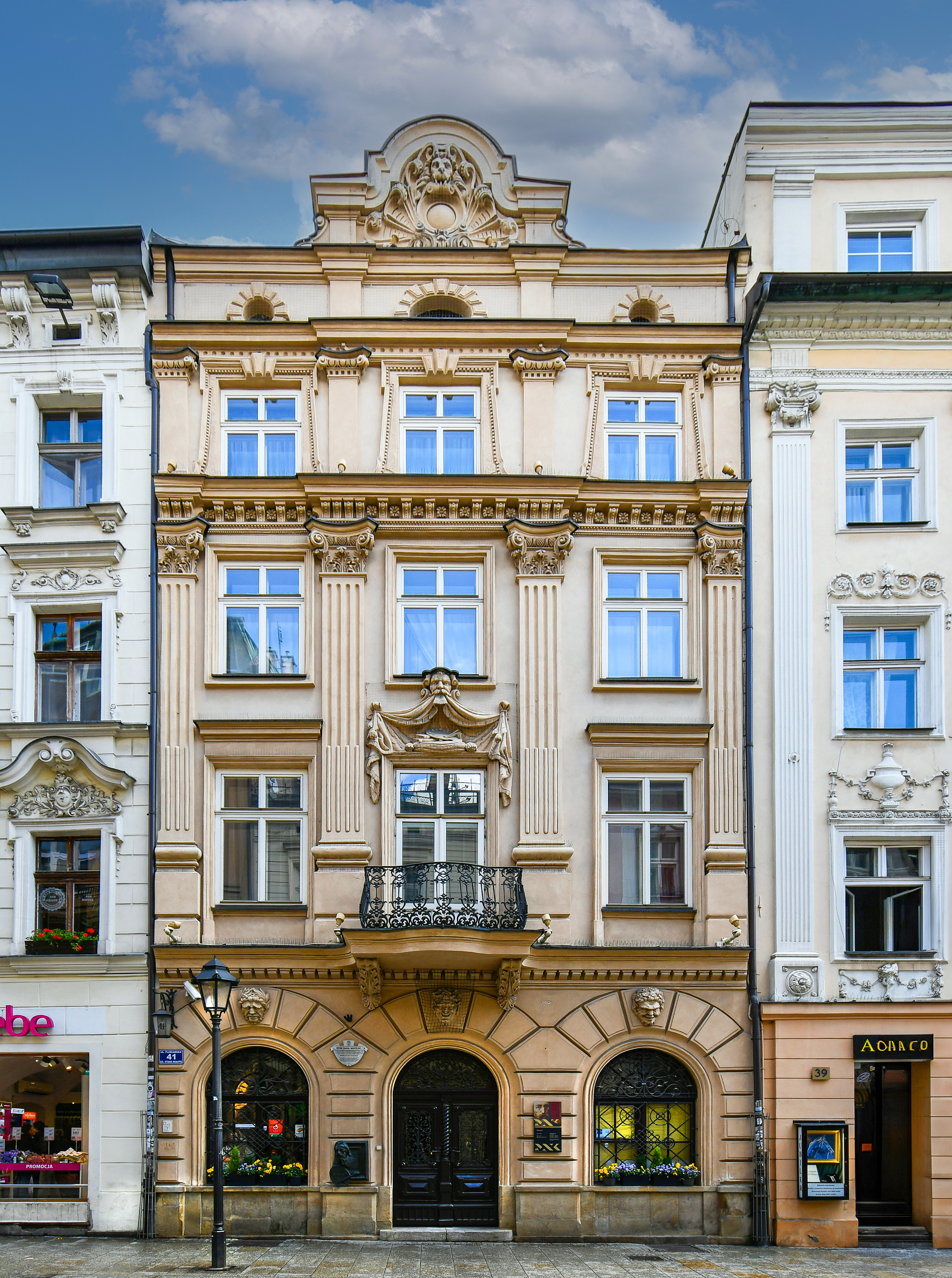

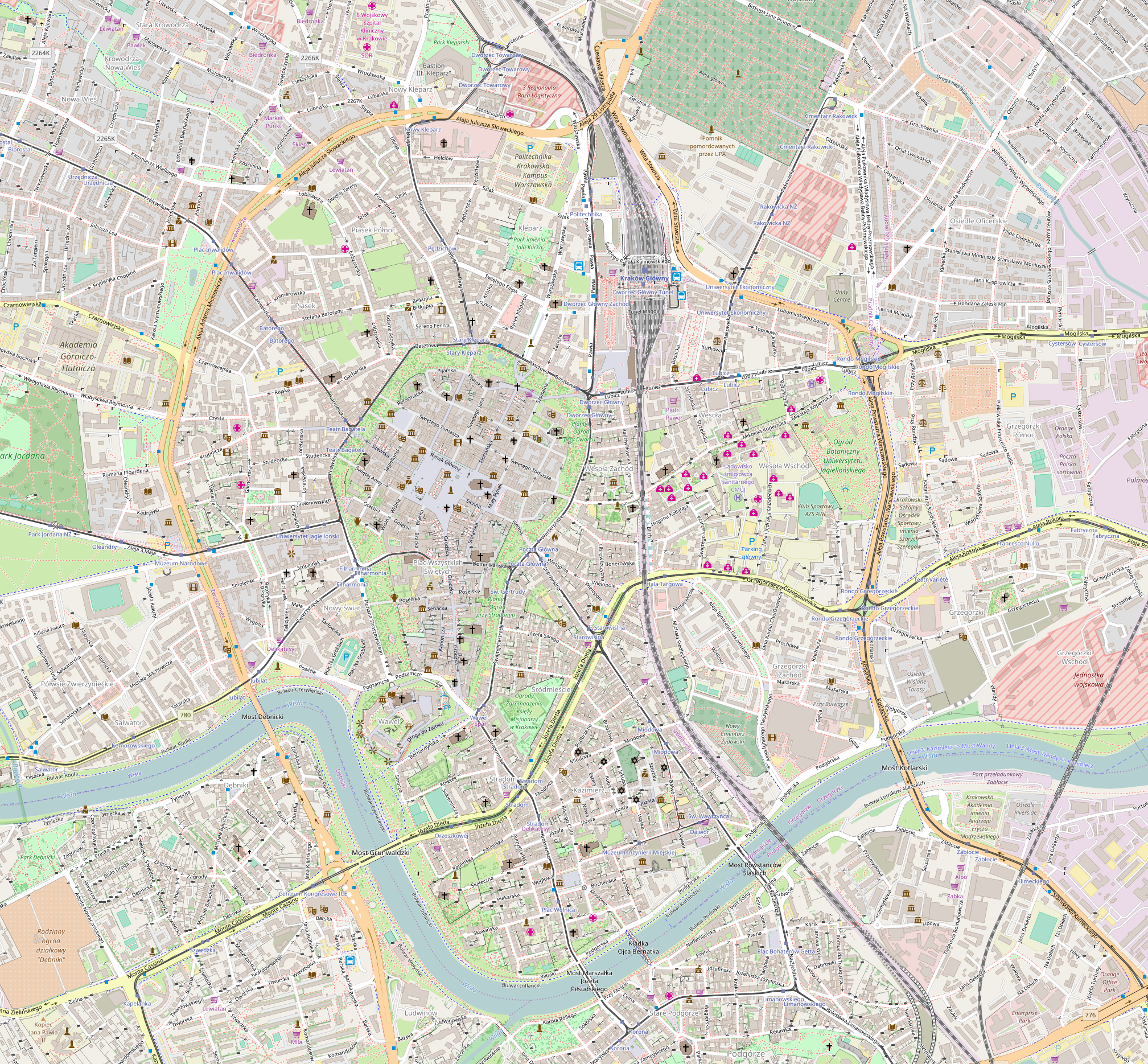
- Location within Central Kraków
- Established: 1895
- Location: 41 Floriańska Street; Kraków; Poland
- Coordinates: 50°3′50″N 19°56′27″E
- Type: Art museum, Biographical museum
- Collections: Painting, Drawings, Memorabilia
- Website: https://mnk.pl/en/the-jan-matejko-house

Jan Matejko House (Polish: Dom Jana Matejki) is a museum dedicated to Polish painter Jan Matejko that was established in 1895 and has been a branch of the National Museum in Kraków since 1904.

The building has been listed as a cultural property under the registration number A-58 in 12.05.1931

== History ==
=== History of the building ===
The building on Floriańska 41 was erected back in the 16th century as a one-storey tenement. In the 18th century, a second storey was added to the tenement, followed by a third storey topped with a mansard roof in the 19th century. In 1752, the tenement was bought by Ignacy and Anna Hendel. In 1794, the property was acquired by Jan Piotr Rosberg and Marianna Rosberg, the parents of Franiszek Ksawery Matejko's wife. After the death of Franciszek Ksawey Matejko in 1860, the tenement was inherited by his children. In 1871, one of Franciszek's sons – Jan Matejko – paid off his siblings and assumed sole ownership over the property. Then, Jan Matejko ordered renovation works that lasted two years and moved in with his family.

=== History of the museum ===
On the 8th of November 1893, a day after Matejko's funeral ceremony, Marian Sokołowski penned an article for a Cracovian newspaper Czas (Time), calling for honouring the deceased painter by establishing a dedicated museum, following the example set up by Urbino and Florence which had set up museums in historic houses of, respectively, Raphael and Michelangelo.

In response, Prince Eustachy Stanisław Sanguszko, President of the Jan Matejko Society, started raising funds to purchase the house from Matejko's relatives and transform it into a public museum. On the 7th of November 1895, the Society succeeded and bought the house together with some of its contents. The museum was opened to the public on the 1st of May 1896, at first offering the visitors to view the living room and the master bedroom. During this time, the museum began efforts to archive literature on Matejko and to document almost all of his artworks in photographs.

On the 26th of June 1904, the Jan Matejko Society officially transferred ownership over the museum to the Kraków City Council, which decided to grant Jan Matejko House under the administration of the National Museum in Kraków. During the World War II, fearing Nazi plunder, some of the Matejko works were stashed in secret in the then-closed Jan Matejko House. The museum reopened after a general renovation in 1953. The next major renovation of Jan Matejko House took place in 2009.

== See also ==
- Jan Matejko Manor House
- List of single-artist museums
