= Gorska =

Gorska may refer to:

- Górska, a Polish-language feminine surname
- Gorska, Bulgaria, a village in Elena Municipality, Veliko Tarnovo Province
