= Gursky =

Gursky is a surname. It is a variant of Górski and Gurski. Notable people with the surname include:

- Al Gursky (born 1940), American football player
- Andreas Gursky (born 1955), German photographer
- Herbert Gursky (1930–2006), American astronomer
- Samuel Gursky (born 1991), American filmmaker

== See also ==
- Solomon Gursky Was Here, a 1989 novel by Mordecai Richler
- Gurski, a related surname
