= Gorsky (surname) =

Gorsky (masculine, Russian: Горский) or Gorskaya (feminine, Russian: Горская) is a Russian surname. Notable people with the surname include:

- Alex Gorsky (born 1960), American businessman, former chairman and CEO of Johnson & Johnson
- Alexander Alexeyevich Gorsky (1871–1924), Russian ballet dancer and choreographer
- Alexander Vasilyevich Gorsky (1812–1875), Russian historian
- Anatoly Gorsky (c. 1907–1980), Soviet espionage agent
- Doreen Gorsky (1912–2001), English politician
- Eugene Gorsky (born 1980), American guitarist
- Ivan Gorsky (1893–1975), Soviet geologist and paleontologist
- Vladimir Gorsky (1953–2008), Russian-American painter
- Vyacheslav Gorsky (born 1953), Russian pianist
- Yana Gorskaya (born 1977), Russian film editor

== Double surname ==
- Yuriy Gorlis-Gorsky
- Sergey Prokudin-Gorsky (1863–1944), Russian photographer

== See also ==
- Górski, Polish surname
