= Bruno Berger-Gorski =

German opera director

- Born: August 8, 1962; Hagen, Germany
- Education: Albrecht Dürer Gymnasium, University of Vienna
- Occupation: opera director
- Notable work: see Works

Bruno Berger-Gorski (born August 8, 1962, Hagen, Germany) is a German opera director of Polish descent. He lives in Vienna, Cologne and Nuremberg.

== Career ==
Bruno Berger-Gorski attended the Albrecht Dürer Gymnasium in Hagen, North Rhine-Westphalia. He later attended the University of Vienna, where he studied theater, music and art history and finished with a master's degree. While still at university he wrote a work on Dirk D'Ase called Dirk D'Ase und sein musikdramatisches Werk mit besonderer Berücksichtigung der Uraufführung 'Einstein, Spuren des Lichts' (roughly: Dirk D'Ase and his dramatic music works with special consideration for the premiere of Einstein, Footsteps in Light). Berger-Gorski has demonstrated a focus on rediscovering old or rarely performed operas. He has directed works by Udo Zimmermann, Ella Milch-Sheriff, Giselher Klebe, Tom Johnson, Manfred Trojahn, Knut Vaage and Camille Kerger. His staging of Offenbach's Die Rheinnixen (The Rhine Nixies) at the Theater Trier was designated Rediscovery of the Year 2005 by the German opera journal Opernwelt. Berger-Gorski is the only active German opera director who has staged operas on four continents.

As an internationally invited director, Berger-Gorski has brought more than 100 opera titles from the standard repertoire onto stages around the world. He often purchases rare and contemporary works, such as Dirk d'Ase's Einstein (World Premiere in Ulm), Gomes' Condor for the Festival Amazonas de Ópera in Manaus, Wolf-Ferrari's Sly or most recently Adreana Hölszky's Triologia in Bonn or Ella Milch-Sheriff's Baruch's Schweigen at Theater Fürth.

Berger-Gorski's mastery of 5 languages has allowed him to direct at Opera-houses like the Teatro Colon in Buenos Aires, the Gran Teatre del Liceu in Barcelona, the Teresa Carreño Cultural Complex in Caracas, the National Theatre (Prague), the Teatro Solis in Montevideo, the Seoul Arts Center in Korea, in Ashkelon, at the Greek National Opera in Athens and at the Florida Grand Opera in Miami.

At present, Berger-Gorski is directing premieres of works by Josef Tal and Ella Milch-Sheriff in Bonn, Luxembourg and Vienna. In August 2015, he directed Prokofiev's Betrothal in a Monastery in São Paulo, and in 2016 in Wroclaw, as part of its program as European Capital of Culture, he is putting on a new production of Verdi's Macbeth.

In 2017 Berger-Gorski is invited to direct Samson and Delilah (opera) at the Dallas Opera with Olga Borodina and Conductor Emmanuel Villaume.

== Works (selection) ==
Year	Production
2016	Der Freischütz (The Marksman) (Weber) for Theater & Philharmonie Thüringen with Laurent Wagner (Conductor)
	Macbeth (Verdi) for the Opera Wroclaw with Vladimir Chmelo for the European Capitals of Culture Program of the European Commission
	Conversation with a stone (Ella Milch-Sheriff) the Chamber Opera The Garden (Josef Tal) linked by the sculpture Carrelino by Daniel Spoerri at the Theater Esch (Luxemburg) in Cooperation with the Opera Bonn, Conductor Marino Formenti, with the United Instruments of Lucelin
2015	Conversation with a stone (Ella Milch-Sheriff), scenic world premier and the Chamber Opera The Garden (Josef Tal) linked by the sculpture Carrelino by Daniel Spoerri at the Bundeskunsthalle Bonn in Cooperation with Oper Bonn, Patronage Hadar Handelsman (Israelian Ambassador), Conductor Marino Formenti
	Betrothal in a Monastery/Verlobung im Kloster (Prokofiev) for the Theatro Sao Pedro in São Paulo, with Luiz Malheiro (Conductor)
	Baruch's Schweigen (Ella Milch-Sheriff) for the Theater in Fürth
2014	Macbeth with Lucio Gallo for the Centennial Hall in Wroclaw / Breslau
	Otello (Rossini) with R.D. Smith, Maria Luigia Borsi for Oviedo, Ives Abel (Dirigent)
	Der Liebesfluch U.A Kammeroper about "Georg Trakl" by Kraus-Hübner, in Salzburg with Marino Forementi, Trakl-Gedenkstätte, Stage Daniel Spoerri
	Zauberflöte for the Opera Maribor, Slowenien
2013	Don Giovanni (Gazzaniga) for the Janáček-Opera in Brno, co-production with Teatro del Giglio Lucca, Teatro Donizetti in Bergamo
	Rigoletto (Verdi) for Trier with Jacek Strauch
	Someone is going to come by Knut Vaage / Jon Fosse combined with Mond aus kochender Milch by C.Kerger / N.Helminger europ. E.A for Kaiserslautern / TNL Louxemburg
	Otello for the Theater Bremerhaven with Ray.M.Wade / Sangmin Lee
2012	Zauberflöte for Opera Zuid/Maastricht
	Don Carlos (Verdi) with Noa Danon for the Theater Magdeburg – co-production with National Theater Brno
2011	Lakmé (Delibes) für the Theater Trier with Adreana Kraschewski
	Mass/Bernstein scenic performance for the Votiv-Church in Vienna
	La bohème (Leoncavallo) for the Theater Hagen, 100 Jahre Jubilee with Jaclyn Bermudez
2010	Mass/Bernstein for Opera Bergen
	Tosca (Puccini) with Iano Tamar/Gustavo Porta for the Performing Art Center in Mumbai/Indien
	Don Giovanni with Carlo Colombara for Lucca/Bergamo
2009	Der Vampyr (Marschner) für the Opera Festival Heidenheim
	Vampirabile/ Monolog/ Es kamen schwarze Vögel Adriana Hölszky as scenic World Premier for Bonn, Kammermusiksaal
	Macbeth for the Janáček-National Opera in Brno
	Rigoletto for the Bellas Artes in Mexico-City, with Maria Alejandres, Arturo Chacon
	Rigoletto for the Opera Bonn, with Julia Novikova
	Hänsel und Gretel (Humperdinck) for Opera Zuid, Maastricht, NL
2008	Der Freischütz for the Opera Festival in Heidenheim with J. Havranova, P. Bernhard
	Les contes d'Hoffmann (Offenbach) for Arenum/Bergen with P.Bernhard, K.Coresi
	La traviata (Verdi) with P. Antonucci, Roberto Sacca, P. Gavanelli. Open-air in La Palma at Convento St.Cruz
	La fille du régiment (Donizetti) with Annemarie Kremer for Opera Zuid, Maastricht
2007	Il trovatore (Verdi) with G.Oniani for Staatsoper Kazan/Den Haag
	La clemenza di Tito (Mozart) in the M.Trojahn-Composure for Würzburg
	Il trovatore with Ikaia-Purday/G.Oniani, R.Ragatzu for Kaiserslautern
	Norma (Bellini) with Olga Makarina, Carmen Oprisanu at the National Theater Prague
	Hänsel und Gretel for the Theater Greifswald/Stralsund
2006	La bohème for the Opera in Thessaloniki with Alexia Voulgaridou, Andrea Coronella, Stage: Daniel Dvorak
	Susannah (Floyd) as Scandinavian premiere for the Vest Norges Opera in a hangar at the Airport Bergen
	The Marriage of Figaro (Mozart) – excerpts for the Conservatoire Luxembourg
	Samson et Dalila (Saint-Saëns) with J.Perdigon/Graciella Araya for the Vest-Norges-Opera
2005	Die Zauberflöte for the Florida Grand Opera in Miami, US
	Die Rheinnixen (Offenbach) as a German premiere for the Theater Trier, Rediscovery of the Year (Opernweltjahrbuch)
	Tannhäuser (Wagner) for the Opera in Oviedo, Spanien, with W.Millgramm, E.Magee, G.Araya, Conductor:F.Haider, Scenography: H.Balthes
	Azrael (Dirk D'Ase) Tango-Opera as a German premiere for the Theater Trier
2004	Traviata Open-air with Ana-Maria Kaufmann, Harry Van der Plaas, for the Heidenheim Opera Festival
	Einstein (Dirk D'Ase) World Premiere for the City of Ulm, Germany
	Norma for the Amazonas-Festival, Manaus, Brasil with L.Flanigan
	Die 7 Todsünden (Kurt Weill) for the Vest Norges Opera, Bergen
	Eugen Onegin (Tchaikovsky) for the Vest Norges Opera, Bergen
2003	Faust (Gounod) for the Vest Norges Opera, Bergen, with Dario Schmunk, Urban Malmberg, Jana Havranova
	The Rape of Lucretia (Britten) for the Royal Academy of Music, Copenhagen
	Lucia di Lammermoor (Donizetti) for the Landestheater Coburg
	La bohème Landestheater/ Salzburg /großes Festspielhaus with Olga Mykytenko, Vincente Obuena, Alex Exposito, W. Koch
2002	La Cenerentola (Rossini) for the Gold Coast Opera in Florida/USA with J. Rivera
	Abu Hassan (Weber) and Mesdames de la Halle (Offenbach) for the National Opera in Athens (co-production with Chamber Opera Athens)
	Condor (Carlos Gomes) with F.Portari for the Amazonas-Festival in Manaus

Source: operabase.com

== Other sources ==
- Bruno Berger Gorski: Dirk D'Ase und sein musikdramatisches Werk mit besonderer Berücksichtigung der Uraufführung 'Einstein, Spuren des Lichts' , Philologisch-Kulturwissenschaftliche Fakultät der Universität Wien, 2007
