= The Jan Matejko Society =

Association

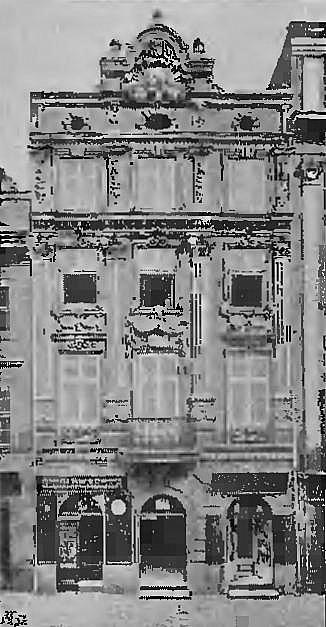
House on Floriańska Street in Kraków (circa 1898)

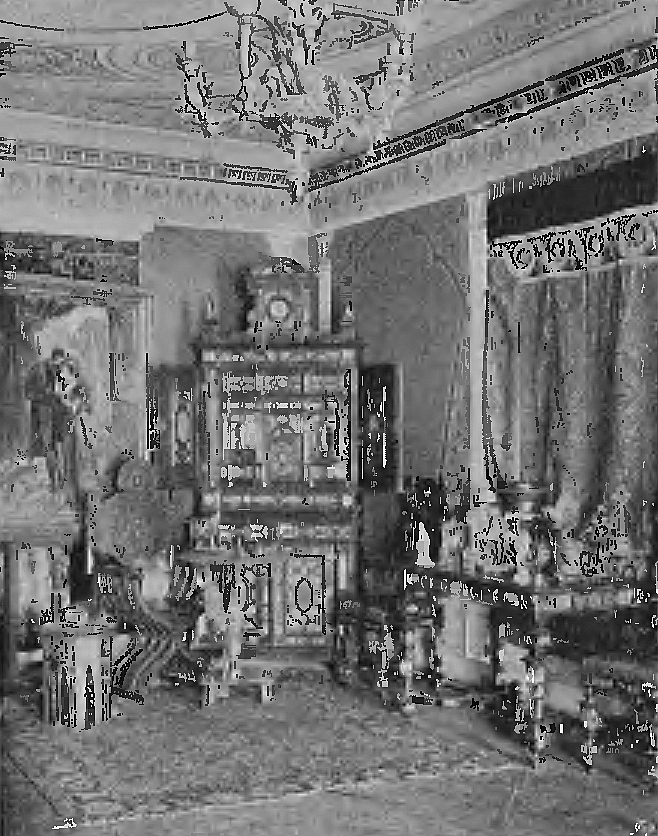
Interior of the house (circa 1898)

The Jan Matejko Society (Towarzystwo im. Jana Matejki) was an association active from 1895 to 1908, which aimed to acquire and transform Jan Matejko's birthplace and residence into a museum before transferring it to the Kraków municipality or a similar institution.

== History ==
After Jan Matejko's funeral, Jagiellonian University Professor Marian Sokołowski suggested purchasing the artist's home to establish a museum. This proposal garnered public support, leading the Kraków municipality to form a committee to honor Jan Matejko's memory. Their inaugural meeting took place in the city hall on January 7, 1894. Elected officials included chairman Eustachy Stanisław Sanguszko, deputy chairmen - Kraków's president Józef Friedlein and Stanisław Tarnowski, treasurer Franciszek Slęk - the director of the savings bank, and secretary Tadeusz Stryjeński. The committee also included an executive branch responsible for purchasing Matejko's house, consisting of Marian Sokołowski, Piotr Stachiewicz, Tadeusz Stryjeński, and Franciszek Slęk. Sokołowski reported on the funds collected and pledged so far, totaling over 13,000 zlotys, which were agreed to be deposited in the Savings Bank of Kraków.

In March 1895, the executive committee, augmented by Konstanty Górski, drafted the statute of the Jan Matejko Society, which received approval from the Galician Viceroyalty in April. Consequently, the committee to Honor Jan Matejko's Memory dissolved on May 12, 1895, transferring the collected funds to the society. They acquired the property at 41 Floriańska Street on November 7, 1895, for 35,000 zlotys. An additional 10,000 zlotys from a national department grant was allocated for decorations and costumes. Despite the museum's incomplete arrangement, the decision to open it to the public was made in 1897 following discussions with the curator.

The Matejko House's grand opening and dedication were scheduled for March 6, 1898, with family members, government representatives, clergy, and artists in attendance. Honorary society members, including Eustachy Stanisław Sanguszko, Bishop Ignacy Łobos, Katarzyna Potocka, Adam Sapieha, Marceli Czartoryski, Stanisław Tarnowski, Andrzej Potocki, Zdzisław Marchwicki, and Professor Tadeusz Browicz, were also invited. The dedication ceremony was postponed, with plans to combine it with the unveiling of a monument at St. Mary's Church. However, not all invitees were able to attend. Katarzyna Potocka, Stanisław Tarnowski, and Tadeusz Browicz represented the honorary members. City officials, Józef Friedlein, and councilors Henryk Jordan, Maksymilian Kohn, and Franciszek Paszkowski represented Kraków. The Matejko family was represented by Tadeusz Matejko, Beata Kirchmajerowa and her husband Julian, and brothers Edmund and Adolf. Additionally, Matejko's secretary, Marian Gorzkowski, was present. After touring the house, the family remarked that it was preserved in the same condition as during Matejko's lifetime.

To commemorate this event, plans were made for a medieval fair and the inauguration of an artistic raffle. This initiative collected 116 pieces, including paintings, sculptures, medallions, and art-themed tickets. The funds raised were earmarked for refurbishing the third floor, where Matejko's studio is located, and for establishing a new exhibition space showcasing sketches and photographs. Furthermore, a book titled The House of Jan Matejko was published in 1898, featuring six engravings by Adolf Sternschuss. Proceeds from this publication were allocated to support the Matejko House.

The dedication of the Matejko monument in St. Mary's Church occurred on May 12, yet the planned dedication of Matejko's house did not take place. This event was rescheduled for May 20. Notable attendees included Bishop Jan Puzyna, President Friedlein, Court President Czyszczan, National Museum Director Władysław Łuszczkiewicz, AU Secretary Stanisław Smolka, Kraków Conservator Stanisław Tomkiewicz, Professors Jerzy Mycielski and Piotr Bieńkowski from the Jagiellonian University, and Jan Stanisławski and Józef Unierzyski (Matejko's son-in-law) from the School of Fine Arts, as well as Secretary Gorzkowski. Bishop Puzyna consecrated the house, beginning from Matejko's bedroom and proceeding through the salon, dining room, and office, following a guided tour by M. Sokołowski. Upon the conclusion of the ceremony, attendees signed the commemorative guestbook.

In May 1898, the Viceroy of Galicia, Leon Piniński, visited the house and left his signature in the memorial book.

In 1904, the society entrusted the museum's interim management to the Kraków municipality, upon the city council's approval. The municipality then mandated the National Museum's director to oversee the property and its collections. Concurrently, the Council earmarked 800 zlotys for refurbishments to the Matejko House.

The society held its final meeting on January 19, 1908, in the Collegium Novum hall. Following the Kraków City Council's resolution approving the society's transfer of the Matejko House and its museum, it was arranged that the act of donation would be signed by President Marian Sokołowski, Secretary Stanisław Estreicher, and board member Adolf Sternschuss. Having achieved its primary goal, the society made the decision to dissolve itself in accordance with its statute.

== Organization ==
In accordance with the statute, the society was governed by a board elected by the general assembly, consisting of eight members: a president, vice president, secretary, treasurer, and four additional members.

Active members of the society included its founders and those who contributed at least 100 zlotys. Supporting members were those who pledged annual contributions of at least 6 zlotys, and honorary members were those who contributed 500 zlotys or more or were recognized for their services to the society and nominated by the authorities. Members had the privilege of free museum entry, the right to elect officials, and participate in general assemblies. These assemblies were held once a year, in January.

== Board ==
The first board was not elected by the general assembly, but was appointed in the statute from 1895. It consisted of President Marian Sokołowski, Vice President Tadeusz Stryjeński, Secretary Konstanty Górski, Treasurer Franciszek Slęk, and members Julian Fałat, Karol Pieniążek (Deputy Mayor of Kraków), Edward Raczyński, and Piotr Stachiewicz. During the general meeting on March 13, 1898, a decision was made to increase the number of board members to ten. In addition to President Marian Sokołowski, Secretary Stanisław Estreicher, Treasurer Franciszek Slęk, and Piotr Stachiewicz, the additional members elected were Tadeusz Stryjeński, Edward Raczyński, Józef Mehoffer, Leszek Wiśniowski, and Walenty Staniszewski.
