= Prussian deportations =

Expulsions of Poles by Prussia (1885–1890)

- Part of the expulsion of Poles by Germany
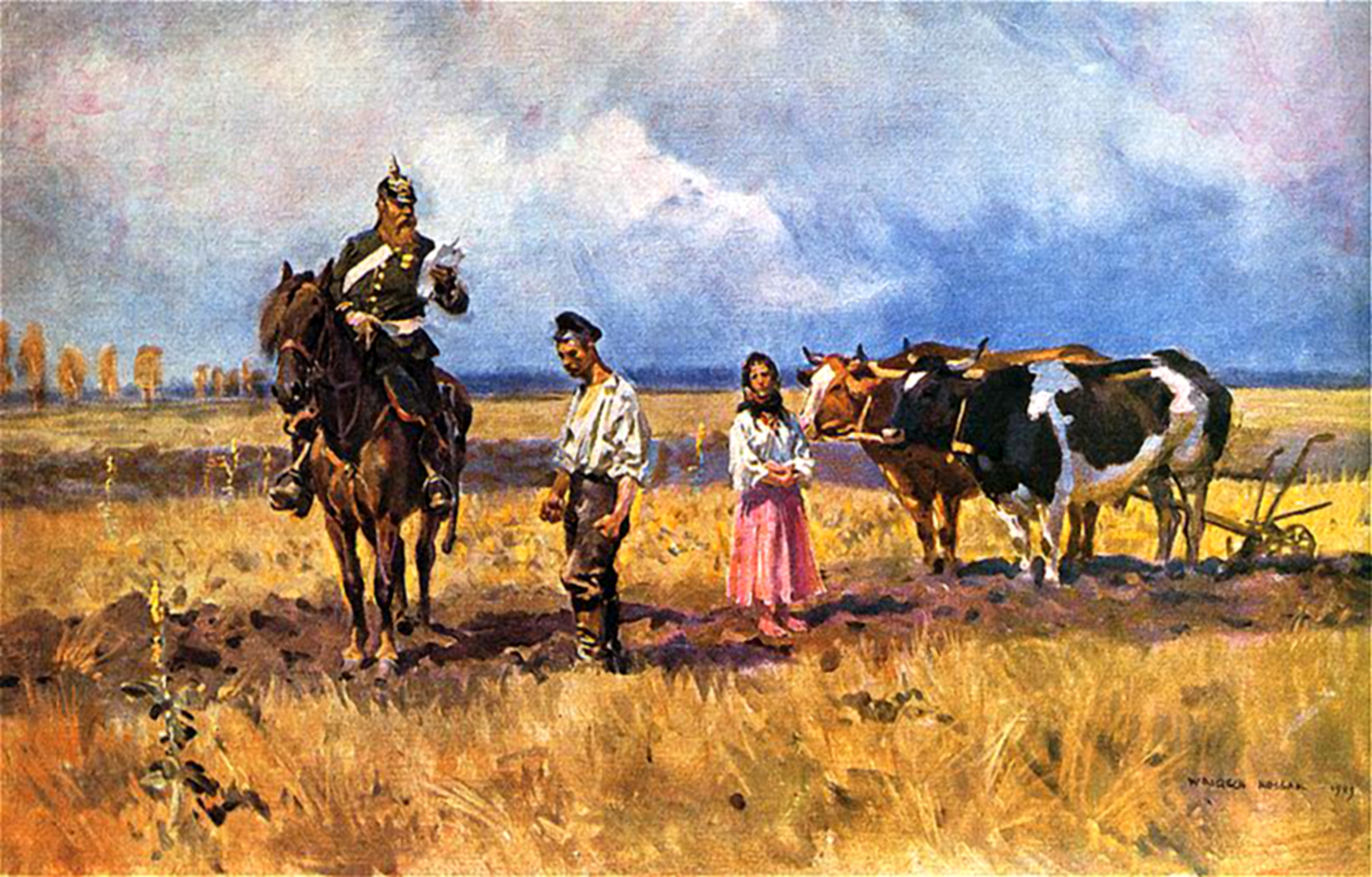
- Rugi pruskie (Prussian deportations of Poles, or Polenausweisungen), 1909 painting by Wojciech Kossak
- Native name: Rugi pruskie
- Duration: 1885–1890
- Location: German imperial Prussia
- Type: mass Deportations
- Cause: Anti-Polish sentiment, Antisemitism, German nationalism
- Patrons: Otto von Bismarck, Imperial Germany
- Outcome: Deportation of over 30,000 Poles from the Prussian Partition of the Commonwealth

The Prussian deportations, also known as the Prussian expulsions of Poles (Polish: rugi pruskie; German: Polenausweisungen), were the mass expulsions of Poles from Prussia between 1885 and 1890. More than 30,000 Poles who had immigrated to Prussia from the Polish regions of the Russian Empire and Austria and did not obtain a German citizenship, were deported back to their country of origin.

The county-wide expulsion was condemned by the Polish public as well as the federal German parliament. The expulsion also contributed to the worsening of Russo-German relations. In the aftermath, Poles without German citizenship were again allowed to work and reside in the German Empire in all seasons but winter. The Prussian deportations have been described as an example of ethnic cleansing.

== The expulsion order of 1885 and its implementation ==
Agriculture in the eastern provinces of Prussia was to a high degree based on large-area manors and run by German junkers, who employed thousands of migrating Poles from the Russian and Austrian part of partitioned Poland. Also, the growing industrial region of Upper Silesia attracted workers from economically backward areas. At the same time, parts of the local German and Polish population migrated in search of work to more industrialized western areas of Germany (Ostflucht). Although no anti-German political activity among the Polish migrants was ever noted, the resulting increase of the Polish population alarmed nationalist German circles, including Germany's chancellor Otto von Bismarck.

On 26 March 1885, the ministry of internal affairs of Prussia ordered its provincial authorities to expel abroad all ethnic Poles and Jews holding Russian citizenship. In July 1885, the expulsion order was extended to include Polish Austrian citizens also. Additionally, the authorities were obliged to watch, that in the future no "undesirable foreigners" would settle on those territories.

The order was executed upon all non-Prussian citizens regardless of their long term residence or previous service in the Prussian Army, and despite their state of health, age or sex. The expellees were "driven in mass towards the eastern border under blows of gendarmes' rifle butts". Fatal incidents were reported, as the expulsions were carried out in winter time. In the initial months, nearly 26,000 people were expelled from eastern provinces of Prussia, mainly workers and craftsmen employed there. The expulsions were continued in subsequent years. Until 1890 the number of expellees exceeded 30,000, and the border of Prussia was closed to all migrants of Polish ethnicity.

== Effects on public opinion ==
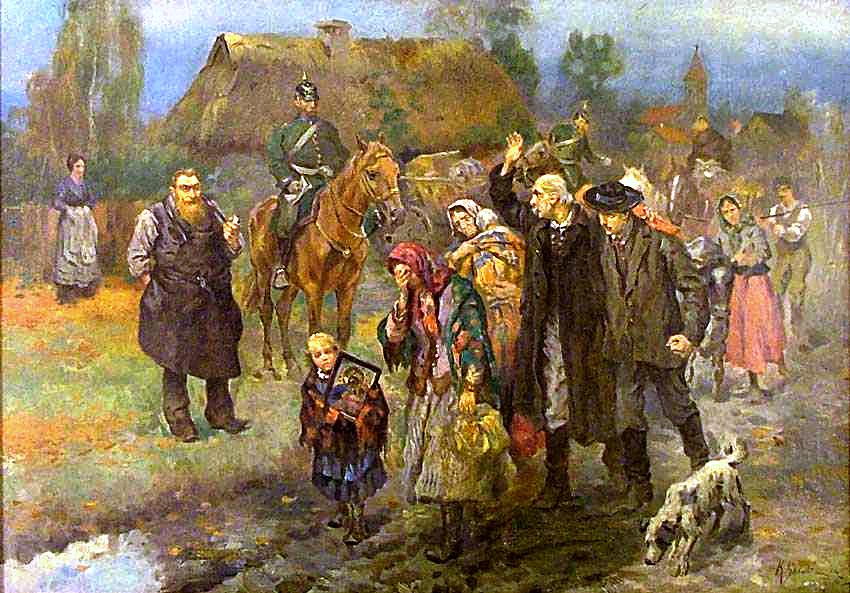
Prussian deportations as shown on painting by Konstanty Górski (1868–1934)

The expulsions resulted in an outcry among the public opinion of Poland, Germany, and Europe. Alfred von Waldersee, who in principle agreed to the necessity of the expulsions, admitted to their "incredible harshness" (German: unglaubliche Härte) in individual cases. Schweinitz, then German ambassador in Russia said, upon reflection: When some day the great chancellor resigns, then many people will feel ashamed and they will mutually reproach themselves with the meanness of their grovelling before his mighty will. I am touched at the most by the unwise and to no purpose cruel order of the expulsions.

The matter was laid before the parliament of the German Empire, forwarded by the ethnic Polish MPs, and supported by the Centre Party, Social Democratic Party and the German progressives. The leader of the Social Democratic Party, Wilhelm Liebknecht, called the chancellor to withdraw the steps which might cause international complications and bring down repressive measures upon Germans living abroad. Ansfeld, a progressive, put in a resolution that the expulsion was not justified by the national interest, it was contrary to humanitarian reasons and posed a threat to the welfare of the empire's citizens. Ludwig Windthorst of the Centre Party submitted a supplementary motion to the same effect. On 16 January 1886, the parliament of the German Empire condemned the expulsion with a great majority of voices. Nevertheless, the parliamentary resolution was ignored by the Prussian government.

A similar question was asked by the Polish MPs and the Centre Party in the parliament of Prussia, but the majority of voices necessary to condemn the expulsions was not obtained there, because political forces of anti-Polish orientation were represented much more strongly in the Prussian parliament than in the parliament of the German Empire.

== Influence on German relations with Russia ==
The formerly good relations between Germany and Russia worsened in the 1880s due to growing nationalist trends in Russian politics. German minorities in the Russian Empire, including Baltic and Russian-born Germans as well as recent German immigrants, faced negative sentiments among both the government and the public supporting the ideas of Pan-Slavism. With that in mind, the German ambassador in Russia, Schweinitz, advised Bismarck to abstain from further expulsions, anticipating that they would only provoke the supporters of Pan-Slavism and trigger repressions against all German settlers in Russia.

The expulsions had been met with disapproval inside the government circles of Russia. Dmitry Tolstoy, a conservative, and the minister of internal affairs who tried to procure a plausible reception for those events in Russia, acknowledged Otto von Bismarck's anti-Polish sentiment and unofficially gave ambassador Schweinitz his advice that Bismarck had committed a grave mistake, as such extreme measures were unnecessary. Also Nikolay Giers, the minister of foreign affairs of Russia, stated that Bismarck – by his own conduct – had aggravated already hostile feelings existing towards German colonists in Russia, had set a bad example to be followed, and had spread the seeds of new ethnic antagonisms in the future. Bismarck himself expressed to ambassador Schweinitz his disappointment, stating that "the Russians showed less satisfaction because of our expulsions than I had expected". Soon afterward, the Russian government imposed legal restrictions on acquisition and lease of land by Germans in Russia, thus limiting the German colonisation movement in the Russian-controlled part of Poland.

Contrary to Bismarck's original intentions, the expulsion contributed to the worsening of Russo-German relations and the erosion of their long term cooperation – resulting in a shift in Russia's external policy which finally led to the creation of the Franco-Russian Alliance soon transformed into Triple Entente, which fought the German Empire during World War I in 1914–1918.

== Softening of expulsion policy after 1890 ==
The need for cheap labour from German landlords and industry eventually prevailed, therefore the policy of the Prussian government had to be softened. In 1890 a new order was issued to allow employment of ethnically Polish foreigners, except in the period between 20 December to 1 February of each year. The measure was intended to force the workers to periodically return abroad, thus preserving their status of seasonal workers, and preventing the continuity of their stay in Prussia. Such a system of annual winter expulsions was adapted to the needs of the landlords, but was harmful to Upper Silesian industry, which used to disobey the order frequently with the silent tolerance of Prussian authorities, or with its temporary suspension. Nevertheless, only unmarried persons were accepted and often, they were kept separated from the local native Polish population.

== Polish migration to Prussia before First World War ==
Since 1905 a semigovernmental agency called the "Head Office of Farm Workers" took up the engagement of workers from outside Germany; the influx of candidates was always large and, in the eve of World War I, the number of immigrant workers exceeded 500,000 persons, 80% of them from the struggling Russian-controlled part of Poland. Approximately 200,000 Poles worked in the eastern provinces of Prussia among low living standards and intensive exploitation. A male worker could save 100-150 Marks per year, while a female worker could save 50-100 Marks per year at best.

== See also ==
- Germanisation
- Ostflucht
