= World War II evacuation and expulsion =

Series of exoduses in the aftermath of World War II

Mass evacuation, forced displacement, expulsion, and deportation of millions of people took place across most countries involved in World War II. The Second World War caused the movement of the largest number of people in the shortest period of time in history. A number of these phenomena were categorised as violations of fundamental human values and norms by the Nuremberg tribunal after the war ended. The mass movement of people – most of them refugees – had either been caused by the hostilities, or enforced by the former Axis and the Allied powers based on ideologies of race and ethnicity, culminating in the postwar border changes enacted by international settlements. The refugee crisis created across formerly occupied territories in World War II provided the context for much of the new international refugee and global human rights architecture existing today.

Belligerents on both sides engaged in forms of expulsion of people perceived as being associated with the enemy. The major location for the wartime displacements was East-Central and Eastern Europe, although Japanese people were expelled during and after the war by Allied powers from locations in Asia including India. The Holocaust also involved deportations and expulsions of Jews preliminary to the subsequent genocide perpetrated by Nazi Germany under the auspices of Aktion Reinhard.

== World War II deportations, expulsions and displacements ==
Following the invasion of Poland in September 1939 which marked the beginning of World War II, the campaign of ethnic "cleansing" became the goal of military operations for the first time since the end of World War I. After the end of the war, between 13.5 and 16.5 million German-speakers lost their homes in formerly German lands and all over Eastern Europe.

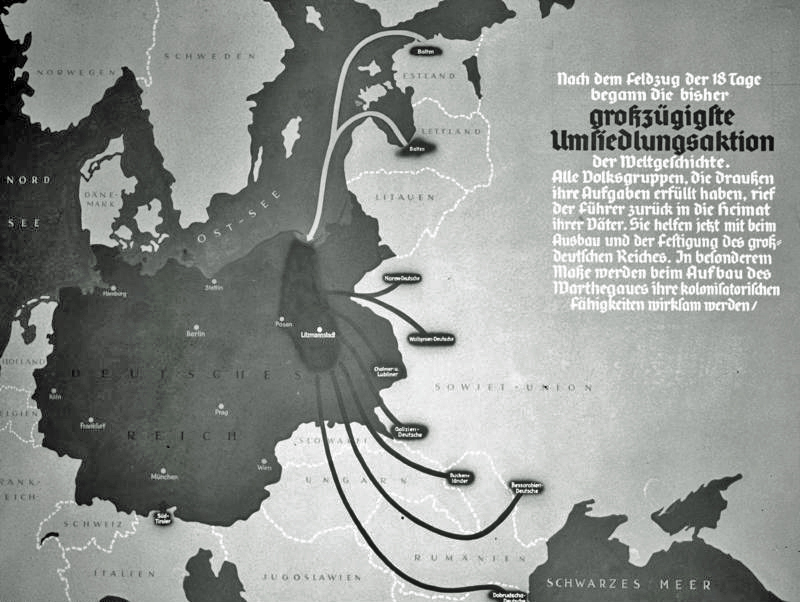
Origin of German colonisers settled in annexed Polish territories in action "Heim ins Reich"

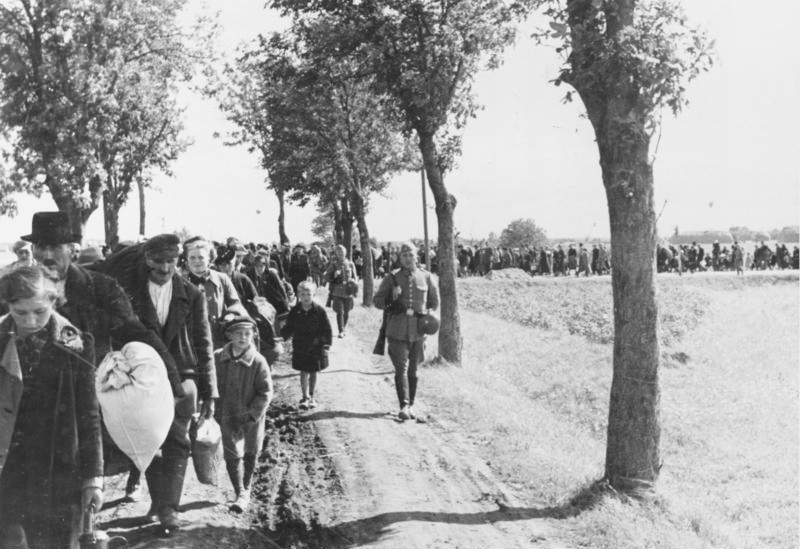
Expulsion of Poles from Reichsgau Wartheland following the German invasion of 1939

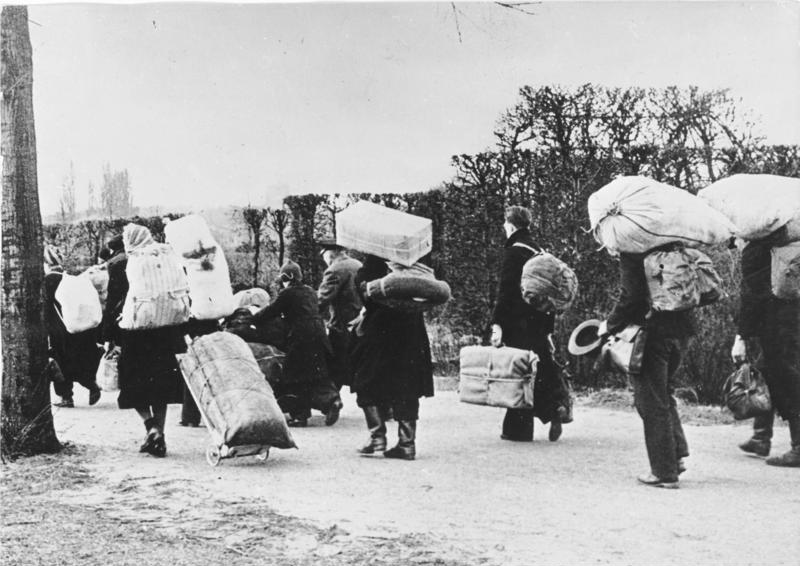
Germans leaving Silesia for Allied-occupied Germany in 1945. Courtesy of the German Federal Archives (Deutsches Bundesarchiv).

=== Aftermath of the invasion of Poland ===
- 1939 to 1945: The Nazis planned to ethnically cleanse the whole Polish population according to a germanisation Master Plan called Generalplan Ost. Eventually in the course of Nazi occupation up to 1.6 to 2 million Poles were expelled, not counting millions of slave labourers deported from Poland to the Reich.
- 1939 to 1940: Expulsions of 680,000 Poles from German-occupied Wielkopolska (German -Reichsgau Wartheland). From the city of Poznań Germans expelled to General Government 70,000 Poles. By 1945, half a million Volksdeutsche Germans from Soviet Union, Bessarabia, Romania, and the Baltic Germans had been resettled during action "Heim ins Reich" by German organisations like Hauptamt Volksdeutsche Mittelstelle and "Resettlement department" of RKFDV (Stabshauptamt Reichkomissar für die Festigung deutsches Volkstums) from Eastern Europe.
- 1939 to 1940: Expulsions of 121,765 Poles from German-occupied Pomerania. On Polish places 130,000 Volksdeutsche was settled including 57,000 Germans from East Europe countries: Soviet Union, Bessarabia, Romania and the Baltic states. Deportation was a part of German "Lebensraum" policy ordered by German organisations like Hauptamt Volksdeutsche Mittelstelle and "Resettlement department" of RKFDV.
- 1939 to 1940: The first evacuation of Finnish Karelia was the resettlement of the population of Finnish Karelia and other territories ceded by Finland to the Soviet Union after and during the Winter War into the remaining parts of Finland. Some of the territories were evacuated during the war or before it, as part of the course of the war. Most of the territory was evacuated after the Soviet Union gained it as a part of the Moscow peace treaty. In total, 410,000 people were transferred.
- 1940 to 1941: The Soviets deported hundreds of thousands of Polish citizens, most in four mass waves. The accepted figure was over 1.5 million. The most conservative figures use recently found NKVD documents showing 309,000 to 381,220. The Soviets didn't recognise ethnic minorities as Polish citizens, some of the figures are based on those given an amnesty rather than deported and not everyone was eligible for the amnesty therefore the new figures are considered too low. The original figures were: February 1940 over 220,000; April around 315,000; June–July between 240,000 to 400,000; June, 1941, 200,000 to 300,000.
- 1940 to 1941: Expulsions of 17,000 Polish and Jewish residents from the western districts of city Oświęcim from places located directly adjacent to Auschwitz concentration camp, and also from the villages of Broszkowice, Babice, Brzezinka, Rajsko, Pławy, Harmęże, Bór, and Budy. The Expulsion of Polish civilians was a step towards establishing the Camp Interest Zone, which was set up in order to isolate the camp from the outside world and to carry out business activity to meet the needs of the SS. German and Volksdeutsche settlers move in. This was one of the numerous forced migrations associated with the Holocaust.

=== World War II ===
- 1940: A population exchange between Bulgaria and Romania is carried out. 103,711 Romanians, Aromanians and Megleno-Romanians are transferred to Romania and 62,278 Bulgarians are evacuated to Bulgaria.
- 1940 to 1941: The deportation of Volga Germans by Soviet Union to Kazakhstan, Altai Krai, Siberia, and other remote areas.
- 1941: The deportation of Estonians, Latvians and Lithuanians by Soviet Union.
- 1941: The deportation and massacres of prisoners in Western Soviet Union.
- 1941 to 1944: During the Finnish occupation of East Karelia during World War II the Russian-speaking population was held in East Karelian concentration camps.
- 1941 to 1944: Expulsion of Poles from the Zamość region was performed in November 1941, and it was continued in June/July 1943, it was code named Wehrwolf Action I and II, and it was carried out in an attempt to make room for German (and to a lesser extent, to make room for Ukrainian) settlers as part of Nazi plans for the establishment of German colonies in the conquered territories. Around 110,000 people from 297 villages were expelled. Around 30,000 of the victims of the expulsion were children who, if they were racially "clean" (i.e. if they had physical characteristics which were deemed "Germanic") were prepared for germanisation by German families in the Third Reich. Most of the people who were expelled were sent to Germany and used as slave labourers or they were sent to concentration camps.
- 1941 to 1944: in Kosovo and Metohija, some 10,000 Serbs lost their lives, and about 80,000 to 100,000 or more were ethnically cleansed.
- 1941 to 1945: More than 250,000 Serbs were expelled from Croatia and Bosnia by the extreme nationalist Ustaše regime during the Serbian Genocide.
- 1941 to 1949: During World War II, Japanese-Americans and Japanese-Canadians were interned in camps.
- 1942: Deportation of the Ingrian Finns from Soviet controlled territory of the Leningrad Blockade.
- 1943 to 1944: The Deportation of Crimean Tatars, Kalmyks, Chechens, Ingush, Balkars, Karachays, and Meskhetian Turks by Soviet Union to Central Asia and Siberia.
- 1943 to 1944: The ethnic cleansing and Massacres of Poles in Volhynia and Eastern Galicia by the nationalist UPA with the bulk of victims reported in summer and autumn 1944.
- 1943 to 1960: The Istrian–Dalmatian exodus involved the diaspora of 350,000, mostly ethnic Italians (Istrian Italians and Dalmatian Italians) together with anti-communist Slovene and Croat people, from Istria, Fiume and Dalmatian lands (mainly from the city of Zara), after the collapse of Italian fascist regime.
- 1944: The displacement of the majority ethnic Estonian population from the Estonian city of Narva by Soviet occupation authorities.
- 1944: The second Evacuation of Finnish Karelia. Some 280,000 Finns had returned to areas ceded in 1940 to the Soviet Union and subsequently re-conquered by Finland in 1941. During summer and autumn 1944, Finland re-ceded these areas back to the Soviet Union, and re-evacuated the Finnish population.
- 1944: The evacuation of almost total civilian population of Finnish Lapland, as a joint Finnish-German effort, before Finnish and German troops commenced hostilities. The evacuees, numbering 168,000 were able to return home within a year.
- 1944 to 1945: The ethnic cleansing of Hungarians, or the massacres in Bačka by Titoist partisans during the winter of 1944–45; about 40,000 were massacred. Afterwards, between 45 and 48, internment camps were set which led directly to the death of 70,000 more, of famine, frost, plagues, tortures and executions.
- 1944 to 1945: Between 16,000 and 20,000 Cham Albanians fled from Thesprotia Prefecture to Albania. Between 200 and 300 were killed.

=== Defeat of Nazi Germany and Imperial Japan ===
- 1944 to 1947 and 1951 The mass deportation of Ukrainian speaking ethnic minorities from the territory of Poland after World War II, culminating in 1947 with the start of Operation Vistula.
- 1944 to 1947 and 1951: 1.5 million Poles were deported from the eastern territories annexed by the Soviet Union into the western territories, which Soviets transferred from Germany to Poland. By 1950, 1.6 million Poles from the eastern territories annexed by the Soviet Union had been settled in what the government called the Regained Territories.
- 1944 to 1948: Flight and expulsion of Germans after World War II. Between 13.5 and 16.5 million German-speakers fled, were evacuated or later expelled from Central and Eastern Europe, making this event the largest single instance of ethnic cleansing in recorded history. estimates of the number of those who died during the process are being debated by historians and they range from 500,000 to 3,000,000.
- November and December 1944: more than 200,000 Danube Swabians in Yugoslavia were expelled from their homes and interned in starvation and Nazi concentration camps for the old, young and disabled. Some 30,000 workers were expelled to Russia as slave laborers for war reparations.
- Tens of thousands of the refugees were repatriated to Yugoslavia and massacred in the Yugoslav death march of Nazi collaborators.
- Repatriation of Cossacks after World War II
- In 1945, American and Republican Chinese forces returned Japanese colonizers from northeast China in what was termed the Japanese repatriation from Huludao. In those areas liberated by the Soviets and not the Americans, these Japanese became Japanese prisoners of war in the Soviet Union.
- After Japan surrendered, the Soviet Union occupied northern Korea and southern Sakhalin. These had been Japanese territories before the war and had millions of Japanese residents, who were now to be expelled. Roughly two-thirds of the Korean residents of Sakhalin were also expelled to Japan, but the others remained stranded in Sakhalin.
- Taiwan was ceded to Japan in 1895 as a consequence of the First Sino-Japanese War and by the beginning of World War II many Japanese civilians had settled there. Between the Japanese surrender of Taiwan in 1945 and 25 April 1946, the occupying Republic of China forces expelled 90% of the Japanese living in Taiwan.
- More than 30,000 Serb colonists were expelled from Bulgarian-occupied Macedonia and south-eastern Serbia
- Aliyah Bet was the code-name for illegal immigration of the Jews of Europe to Mandatory Palestine after the passing of the 1939 White Paper, while the Holocaust was occurring, and the existence of numerous displaced people of Jewish ethnicity, was a factor in the effective eventual establishment of the State of Israel, starting from the passing of United Nations General Assembly resolution 181 (II) . Those migrants were helped by an underground group called Bricha. After Israel was born, European Jewish migration to Israel continued, contributing to Israel's population growth. The 1946 Kielce pogrom and other anti-Semitic incidents provided further push factors for Aliyah.

== Establishment of refugee organisations ==
The United Nations Relief and Rehabilitation Administration was set up in 1943, to provide humanitarian relief to the huge numbers of potential and existing refugees in areas facing Allied liberation. UNRRA provided billions of US dollars of rehabilitation aid, and helped about 8 million refugees. It ceased operations in Europe in 1947, and in Asia in 1949, upon which it ceased to exist. It was replaced in 1947 by the International Refugee Organization (IRO), which in turn evolved into United Nations High Commissioner for Refugees (UNHCR) in 1950.

== See also ==
- The March (1945)
- Refugee workers in Vichy France
