= Gurski =

Gurski and Gursky are phonetic respellings of the Polish-language surname Górski and transliterations of related East Slavic surnames: Гурскі (Belarusian), Гурський (Ukrainian), Гурский (Russian). Notable people with these surnames include:

- Louisa Gurski (born 1988), English canoeist
- Michael Gurski (born 1979), German football coach and former goalkeeper
- Olga Gurski (1902–1975), Ukrainian painter
- Yuri Gurski (born 1983), Belarusian IT entrepreneur

== Fictional people ==
- Solomon Gursky from Solomon Gursky Was Here

== See also ==
- Gursky
