= Tomasz Górski (politician) =

Polish politician (born 1973)

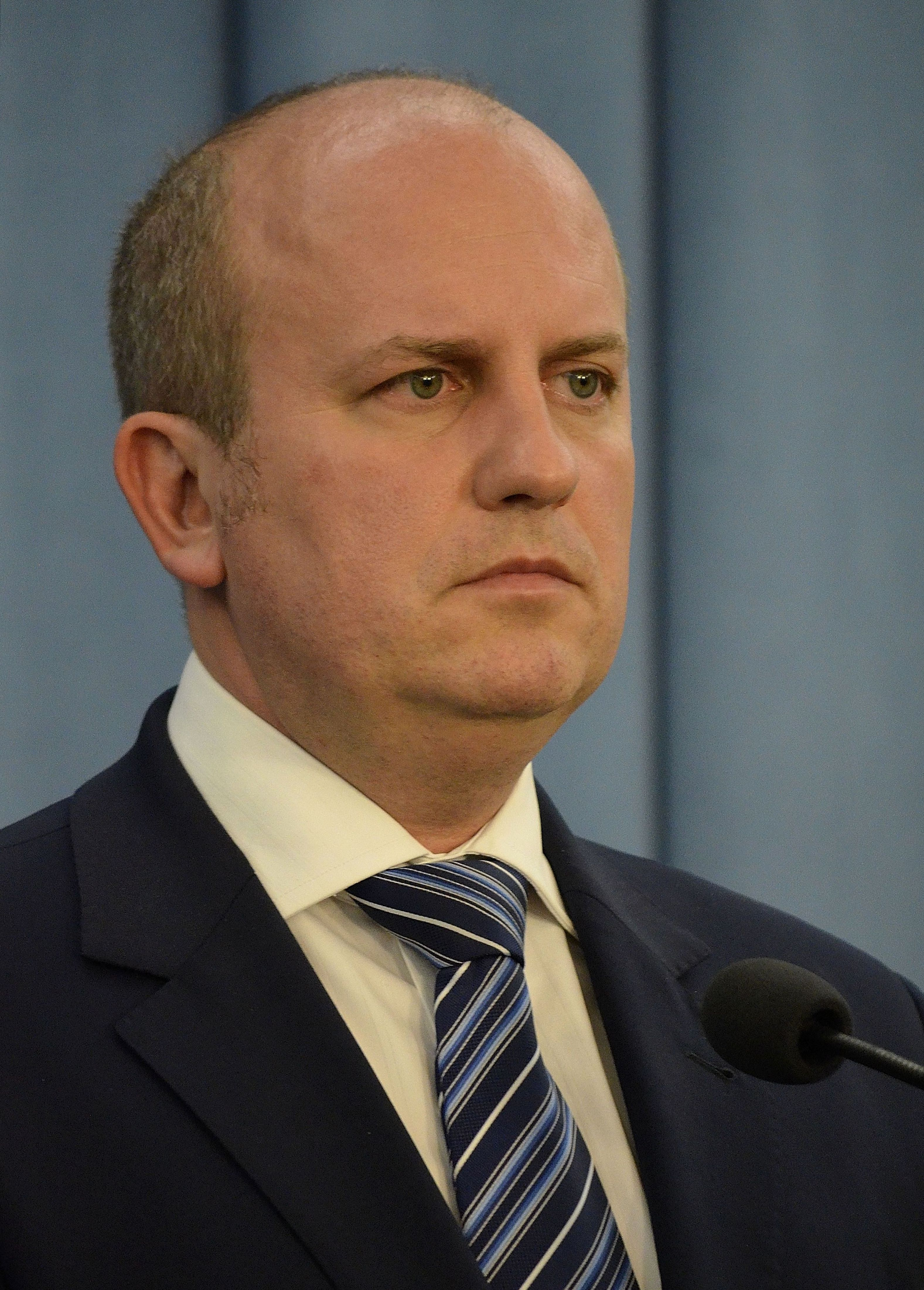

member of Sejm 2005-2007
- In office 25 September 2005 – ?

Personal details
- Born: 1973 (age 52–53)
- Party: United Poland

Tomasz Górski (born 15 August 1973 in Poznań) is a Polish politician. He was elected to the Sejm on 25 September 2005, getting 8664 votes in 39 Poznań district as a candidate from the Law and Justice list.

On 4 November 2011 he, along with 15 other supporters of the dismissed PiS MEP Zbigniew Ziobro, left Law and Justice on ideological grounds to form a breakaway group, United Poland.

== See also ==
- Members of Polish Sejm 2005-2007
