= Gorskaya, Perm Krai =

Gorskaya Горская
- Village
- Location within Perm Krai Location within Russia
- Coordinates: 58°05′N 56°37′E
- Country: Russia
- Region: Perm Krai
- District: Permsky District
- Time zone: UTC+5:00

Gorskaya (Russian: Горская) is a rural locality (a village) in Sylvenskoye Rural Settlement, Permsky District, Perm Krai, Russia. The population was 17 as of 2010. There are 9 streets.

== Geography ==
Gorskaya is located 35 km northeast of Perm (the district's administrative centre) by road. Lyady is the nearest rural locality.
