= Ella Milch-Sheriff =

Israeli composer

Ella Milch-Sheriff אלה מילך-שריף
- Born: 1 September 1954 (age 72); Haifa, Israel

Ella Milch-Sheriff (Hebrew: אלה מילך-שריף; born 1 September 1954) is an Israeli composer, winner of ACUM award for lifetime achievement (2022). Her 5th opera "Alma", premiered in Vienna 2024, won the "Best world premiere award in Austria" in 2026 ceremony. This opera was also nominated for the International Opera award for best contemporary opera.Born in Haifa, Israel, Milch-Sheriff began her career as a composer at the age of 12. During her military service she composed, performed and interpreted her own songs after which she returned to classical music studying composition under the direction of Professor Tzvi Avni and graduating in composition from the Rubin Academy of Music at Tel Aviv University.

Milch-Sheriff, who is based in Tel Aviv, has composed operas, chamber, orchestral and vocal music as well as popular music and solo works.

== Selected works ==
- "Ahlam" (Dreams) for Soprano, mezzo-Soprano and Orchestra, 2026, Tel-Aviv, israel
- Irgendwer (Anyone), six songs for Soprano, Violoncello and Piano, 2026, New-York, USA
- 3 Songs from "Des Knaben Wunderhorn" for Mezzo-Soprano and Orchestra, 2025, Hamburg Philharmonic, Hamburg, Germany
- "Alma", opera in 5 Acts, 2024, Volksoper Wien, Austria
- Clarinet Quartet, Clarinet, Violin, Viola and Cello, 2022, Intonations festival. Berlin, Germany. Jerusalem Chamber Music Festival.
- Abschied (Farewell Eng.), Soprano and Orchestra, 2021, Bochum Symphony Orchestra, Germany.
- "The Eternal Stranger" (Der ewige Fremde), Actor and symphony orchestra, 2020, Beethoven's 250th anniversary, Leipzig, Palermo, London.
- "The Banality of Love" (Die Banalitaet der Liebe), Opera, 2018, Staatstheater Regensburg, Germany.
- "Baruch's Silence" (Baruchs Schweigen), A chamber opera, 2010, Staatstheater Braunschweig, Germany.
- "And the Rat Laughed", Opera, 2005, The Israel Chamber Orchestra in co-production with the Cameri Theatre, Tel Aviv, Israel
- Contrapunctus XIV, J. S. Bach, Orchestration for symphony orchestra, 2019, Bach Festival, Leipzig, Germany.
- Songs from the Edge, String Quartet No. 1 for Mezzo-Soprano and string quartet, 2006, The Chautauqua Festival, NY USA.
- "Shacharit" (Dawn), For Soprano and Baritone solo, mixed choir and chamber orchestra, 2018, The Israel Camerata Jerusalem.
- Conversation with a Stone,, Soprano, Mezzo-Soprano, Women's Choir, Oboe, Violoncello & Piano, 2015, Bonn, Luxembourg.
- Reflections on Love, For Piano solo, 2013, Commissioned and premiered at Rubinstein Competition, Tel-Aviv, Israel
- Concerto for Piano and Orchestra, 2010, Israel Sinfonietta.
- "Dark am I", A musical fantasy based on "The Song of Solomon", for Soprano, Counter-Tenor, Tenor, Bass and chamber ensemble, 2007, The Israel Festival, Jerusalem.
- "Can Heaven be Void" (Ist der Himmel leer?), for Narrator, Mezzo-Soprano & Orchestra (Versions in English, German, Italian, Polish, Lithuanian & Hebrew) 2003, Ra'anana Symphonette. Israel.

== Awards ==
2022, winner of ACUM award for lifetime achievement. (ACUM: Israeli organization of composers and authors). In 2005, Ella Milch-Sheriff was awarded the prestigious “Israeli Prime-Minister Prize” for her compositional works and the same year, her opera, "And the Rat Laughed” conceived with Nava Semel and based on her book received the “Rosenblume Prize” for achievement.

Best music for a film for "Past Life", Montreal JFF, 2017. Festival du Cinéma Israélien de Montréal

2025, nomination for best world premiere award at the International opera award, 2025.

2026, Best world premiere in Austria award at the Musiktheater Prize in Vienna 2025.

== Personal life ==
Ella Milch-Sheriff was married to the Israeli composer Noam Sheriff from 1982 until his death in 2018.

She is now married to Noam Ziv since 2024.
