= Horský =

Horsky or Horský (Czech/Slovak feminine: Horská) is a surname. It is derived from the Czech, Slovak, and Ukrainian noun hora ("mountain"). Notable persons with the surname include:

- Alla Horska (1929–1970), Ukrainian painter
- Charles Antone Horsky (1910–1997), American lawyer
- Jaroslava Horská
- Ladislav Horský (1927–1983), Slovak ice hockey player
- Michal Horský (1943–2018), Slovak politician
- Miluše Horská (born 1959), Czech pedagogue and politician
- Ondřej Horský (born 1977), Czech sprint canoer
