= Vladimir Gorsky =

American painter

Vladimir Gorsky (1953–2008) was a Russian-American painter.

Gorsky was born in Moscow and emigrated from Russia to Texas. He died on September 30, 2008, at 13:56. His art is on the walls of heads of state, private collectors, and art galleries around the world. His portfolio ranges from a Russian fairy tale series to miniature gold leafed portraits on small wooden eggs. Special projects include "From the Depth of Ages" depicting historical artwork from stone tablets to the Mona Lisa. His painting "Tapestry of the Centuries" comprises 350 people and events that shaped the history of the world from the time of Christ up to the year 2000. The medium is mixed media on canvas. The canvas is 9' × 18' and took 3 years to paint. This painting has achieved international recognition. The "Tapestry" is currently on display at the Museum of Biblical Art (Dallas).

Another painting called "Miracle of the Desert", shows many historical images of Las Vegas. Vladimir's collection of pop art "Celebrity Portraits" of musicians, Hollywood idols, world famous icons and entertainers captures the essence of the 20th century in a bold style that is modern yet timeless.

According to Fine Art Magazine:

"Vladimir Gorsky is an unusual talent. Classically trained in techniques defined by the old masters, his art covers themes derived from the Renaissance to the Classics and portraiture brought up to date in an aspect of Pop Art that has been influenced by Andy Warhol".
