= Gorsky, Volgograd Oblast =

Gorsky Горский
- Khutor
- Location within Volgograd Oblast Location within Russia
- Coordinates: 50°48′N 41°56′E
- Country: Russia
- Region: Volgograd Oblast
- District: Uryupinsky District
- Time zone: UTC+4:00

Gorsky (Russian: Горский) is a rural locality (a khutor) in Dobrinskoye Rural Settlement, Uryupinsky District, Volgograd Oblast, Russia. The population was 515 as of 2010.

== Geography ==
Gorsky is located in forest steppe, 9 km northwest of Uryupinsk (the district's administrative centre) by road. Gorsko-Popovsky is the nearest rural locality.
