= Jerzy Górski (footballer) =

Polish footballer

Personal information
- Full name: Jerzy Górski
- Date of birth: 12 December 1948 (age 77)
- Place of birth: Gdańsk, Poland
- Height: 1.83 m (6 ft 0 in)
- Position: Defender

Senior career*
Years	Team	Apps	(Gls)
–1969	Start Gdańsk		
1969–1979	Lechia Gdańsk	191	(2)
- * Club domestic league appearances and goals

Jerzy Górski (born 12 December 1948) is a former Polish footballer who played as a defender, spending the majority of his playing career with Lechia Gdańsk.

== Biography ==
Górski was born in Gdańsk and started playing football with local team Start Gdańsk. In 1969 Górski joined III liga side Lechia Gdańsk, making his Lechia debut on 25 May 1969 in a draw with Olimpia Elbląg. His first four seasons with Lechia were spent chasing promotion to the II liga, finishing 3rd in his first full season, 2nd the season after, before finally winning the league and securing promotion in the 1971–72 season. Górski made 43 appearances for Lechia over the span of those three seasons, eventually becoming an important first team player in Lechia's promotion winning season. Once Lechia started playing in Poland's second division it was much of the same as before, with the team often at the top of the table, with the team narrowly missing out on promotion. Of the seven seasons Górski spent with Lechia in the II liga, the team finished 2nd three times and 3rd once. After 10 years of playing with Lechia and failing to secure promotion to Poland's top division, Górski retired from playing in 1979. In total he made 201 appearances and scored 2 goals in all competitions for Lechia, becoming one of the few players to have achieved the milestone of 200 appearances for the club. After playing football it is known that he coached for various Lechia youth sides.

== Honours ==
Lechia Gdańsk

- III League (g. IV): 1971–72
