= Tim Gorski =

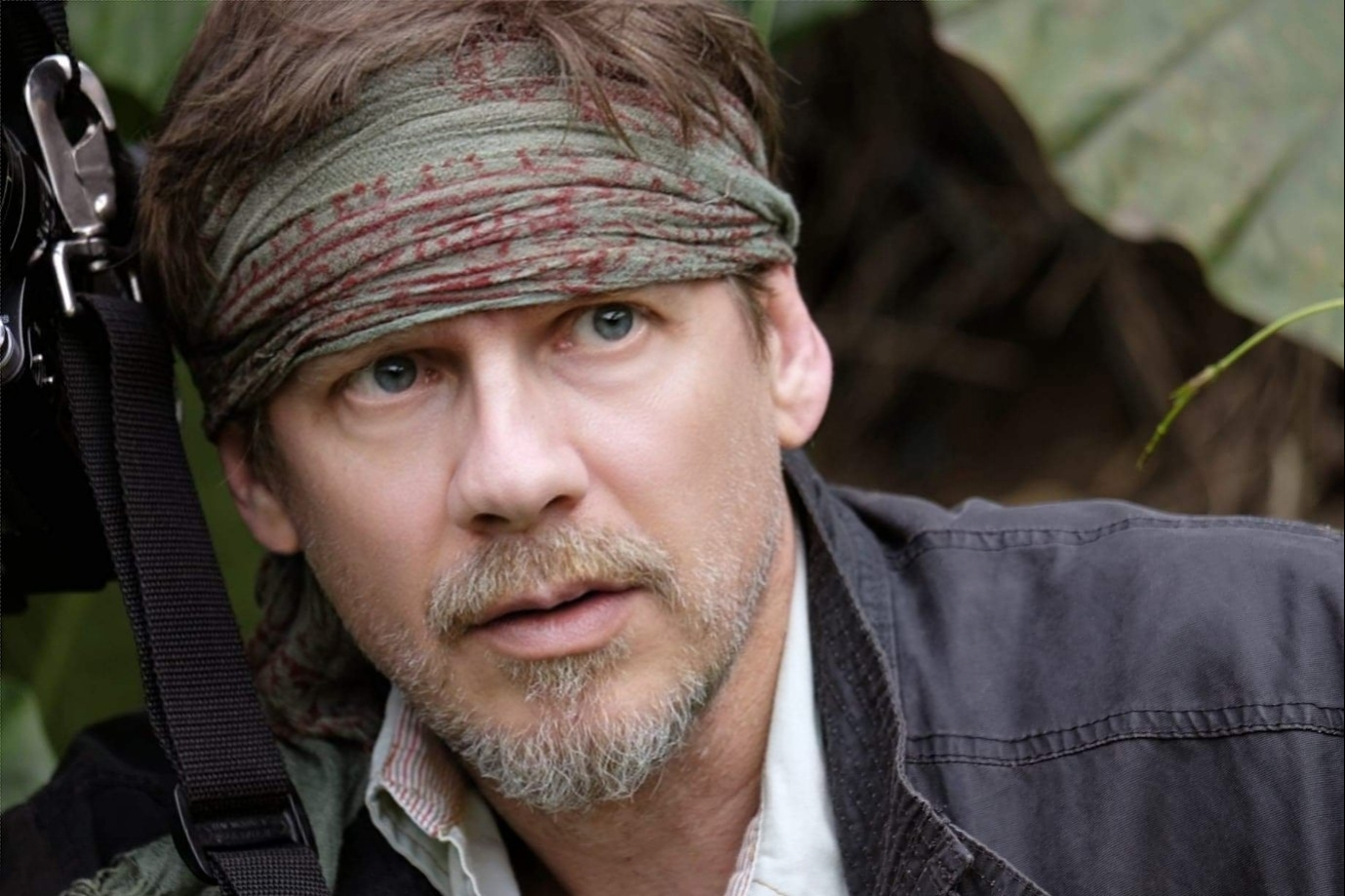
Tim Gorski

Tim Gorski is an American cinematographer, film producer and animal welfare activist, known for his documentaries concerning animal welfare and wildlife conservation, among them the piece How I Became an Elephant (2012), which has received awards and favorable reviews in the media, and his earlier piece Lolita: Slave to Entertainment (2003). Gorski's filmography is visible online.

== Works ==
=== Films ===
- Lolita: Slave to Entertainment (2003), directed by Gorski, this a 56 min documentary narrates how, "in the summer of 1970 a barbaric hunt kills five orca whales and destroys the lives of countless others. Six young orcas are ripped away from their family, sold to marine parks, and shipped across the world to enter into a life of slavery. Three decades later only one survives. And she just so happens to be Miami's biggest performer: Lolita." Publicized in the context of public gatherings demanding freedom of the whale from its seaquarium captivity, the film has been cited as an example of the extent to which documentaries can contribute to change certain realities.
- At the Edge of the World (2008), under the direction Dan Stone and with Gorski's participation as a producer and cinematographer, this 90min documentary chronicles the 2006 campaign by the non-profit Sea Shepherd Conservation Society against a Japanese whaling fleet in the Antarctic. Premiered with success at the Toronto International Film Festival, the movie was lauded at the Monaco International Film Festival 2008, the Woodstock Film Festival (2008), the Atlanta Film Festival 2009, the Documentary Edge Award 2010, and the LA Femme Filmmaker Award in 2012. The documentary has been said to constitute an intrepid record of modern-day piracy.
- How I became an Elephant (2012), a 1h:22min documentary describing the way a sensitive teen-age girl from California joins efforts with an animal activist lady in Thailand to raise awareness against the systematic mistreatment of elephants in the tourist and logging industries, by actions that include developing a clay-elephant art project. The film has been considered an enlightening journey of compassion, action and hope, and deserved multiple awards including the 2012 Femme International Film Festival (Best Documentary Winner), the 2013 Mostra Animals Film Festival (Audience Tribute), and the 2013 Jackson Hole Wildlife Film Festival (Best Children's Program)

=== Other ===
Gorski is also known for his involvement in animal rescue and relief operations in remote regions of the world, including Taiwan, where he worked as the CEO of a non-profit organization acting in the field. His ventures have been reviewed in Ted Talk, Wildlife SOS, VoiceAmerica, and specialized blogs. His account as a survivor of the 2004 Indian Ocean earthquake and tsunami in a severely affected area of Thailand was published on The South Florida Sun Sentinel in 2005.
