= Jan Matejko Manor House =

Museum of the Polish painter Jan Matejko, Kraków

Jan Matejko's Manor House in Krzesławice
- Dworek Jana Matejki w Krzesławicach
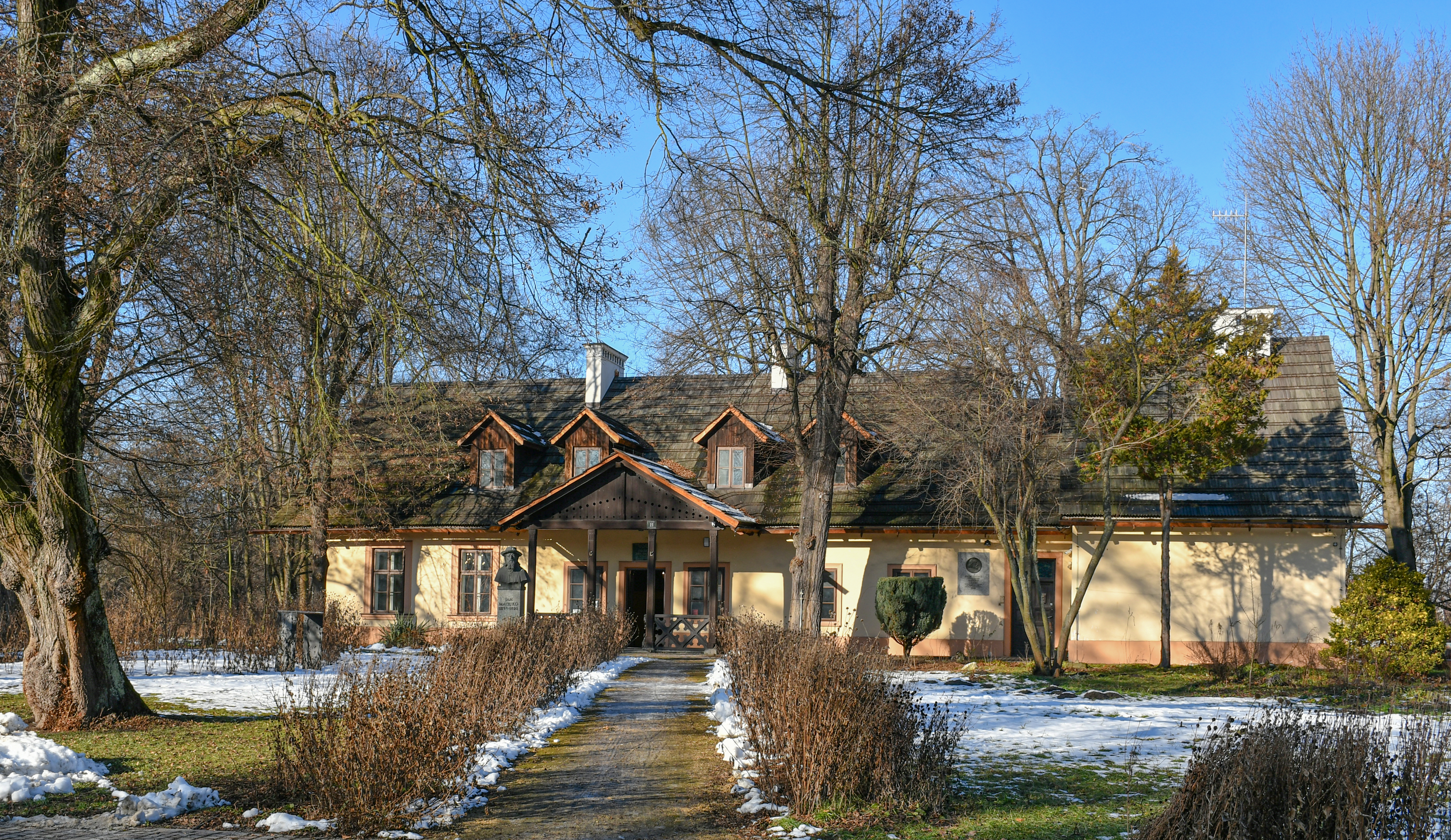
- Established: 1965
- Location: 25 Wańkowicza Street; Kraków; Poland
- Coordinates: 50°04′54.7″N 20°03′19″E
- Type: Art museum, Biographical museum
- Collections: Painting, Drawings, Memorabilia

Jan Matejko's Manor House in Krzesławice (Polish: Dworek Jana Matejki w Krzesławicach) is a museum dedicated to Jan Matejko and Hugo Kołłątaj, on 25 Wańkowicza Street in Kraków, Poland. It was established in 1965. The owner is Kraków Society of Friends of Fine Arts.

== Bibliography ==
- (in Polish) * Praca zbiorowa Encyklopedia Krakowa, wydawca Biblioteka Kraków i Muzeum Krakowa, Kraków 2023, ISBN 978-83-66253-46-9 volume I page 300 (Encyclopedia of Krakow)

== See also ==
- Jan Matejko House
- List of single-artist museums
