= Floriańska Street, Kraków =

Street in Kraków, Poland

Floriańska Street
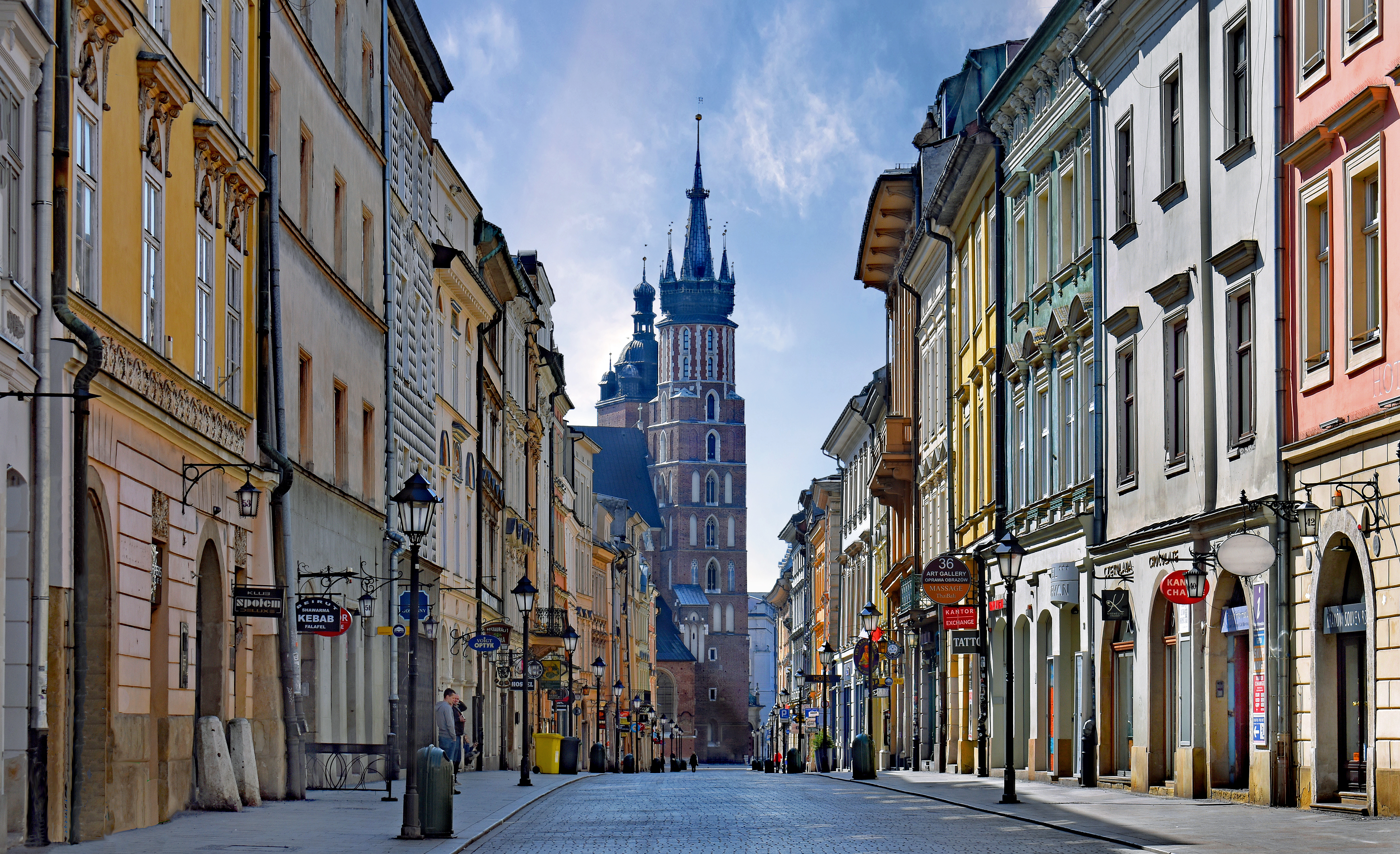
- Floriańska Street with view of St. Mary's Church

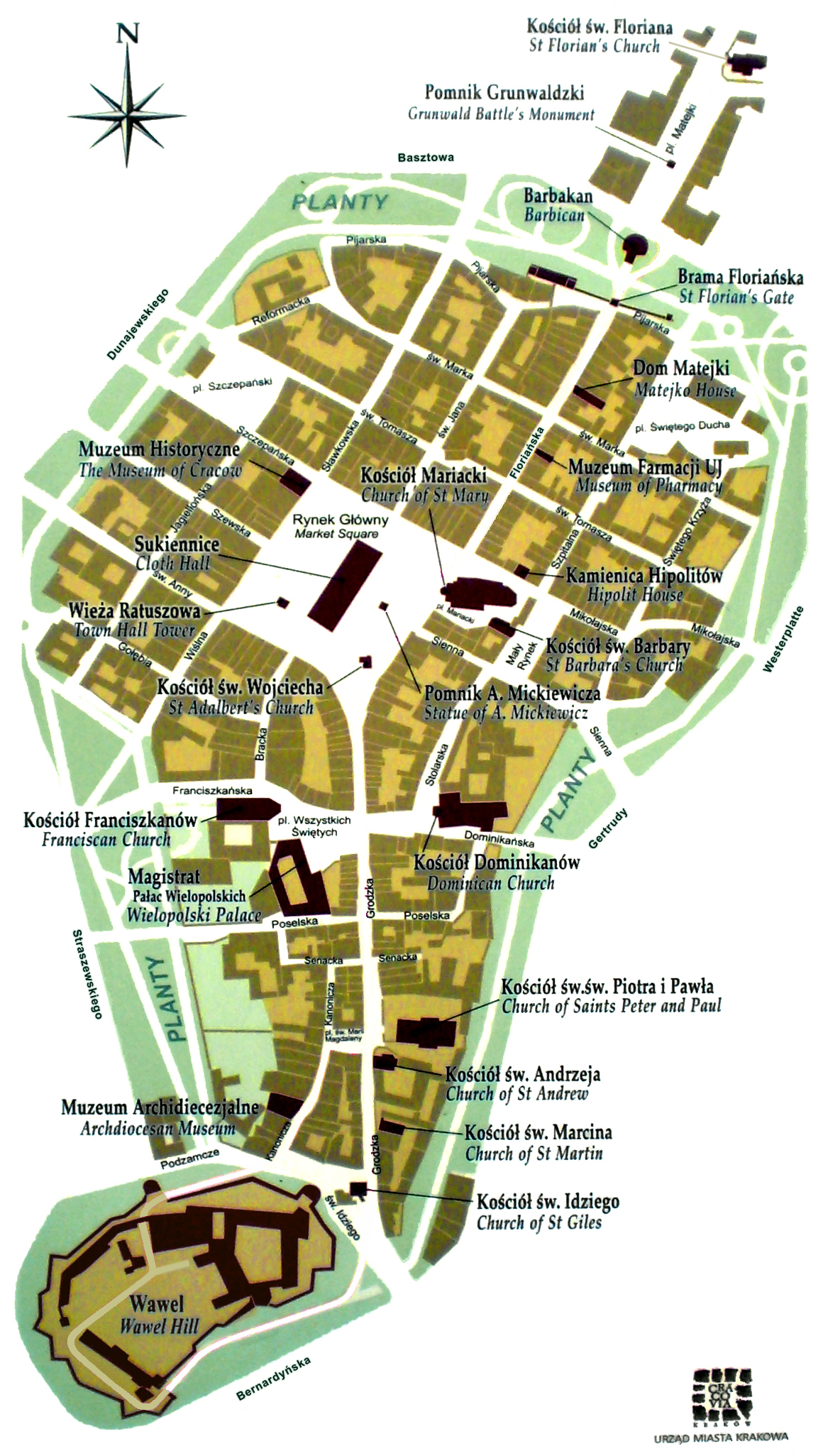
- Map of Kraków's Old Town, with Floriańska Street photo location marked in red
- Native name: ulica Floriańska (Polish)
- Length: 335 m (1,099 ft)
- Width: 12
- Location: Kraków, Poland
- Coordinates: 50.0633°N 19.9402°E

Construction
- Commissioned: 1257

UNESCO World Heritage Site
- Type: Cultural
- Criteria: iv
- Designated: 1978
- Part of: Historic Centre of Kraków
- Reference no.: 29
- Region: Europe and North America

Historic Monument of Poland
- Designated: 1994-09-08
- Part of: Kraków historical city complex
- Reference no.: M.P. 1994 nr 50 poz. 418

Floriańska Street (Polish: ulica Floriańska, Latin: platea Sancti Floriani) is one of the main streets in Kraków Old Town and one of the most famous promenades in the city. The street forms part of the regular grid plan of Kraków Old Town, the merchants' town that extends the medieval heart of the city, which was drawn up in 1257 after the destruction of the city during the first Mongol invasion of Poland of 1241.

== Location ==
Floriańska appears on the 1257 plan of the extended city. It is part of the Royal Road and leads from the north-east corner of the Main Market Square, to the St. Florian's Gate in the former defensive walls, a distance of 335 metres (1,099 ft). There are currently 51 numbered buildings on the street (up to no 44 even and no 57 odd). It is named after Saint Florian.

In 1882, the first horse tram line started. In 1901 it was transformed into the electricity line (now defunct).

A number of notable landmarks and monuments, mainly tenement house (kamienica)-style buildings, are located on the street. They include buildings in the first half no 1, Kamienica pod Murzynami, no 2, Kamienica Mennica, no 13, Kamienica "Amendzińska" (also known as the Kmita Palace), no 14, the Hotel Pod Rózą, and later, the Pharmacy Museum of the Jagiellonian University Medical College at no 25, the Jan Matejko House at no 41, and the Jama Michalika cafe at no 45. The north-eastern end of the street passes through St. Florian's Gate.

Today, the street is a major tourist attraction, and most buildings feature shops, restaurants, cafes and similar establishments. In 2007, the Polish magazine Wprost ranked Floriańska Street as the third most prestigious street in Poland, and the most prestigious in Kraków, following Warsaw's Nowy Świat (New World Street) and Krakowskie Przedmieście Street. In 2011 and 2013, rents at Floriańska Street was ranked second in Poland, second only to that for Nowy Świat Street.

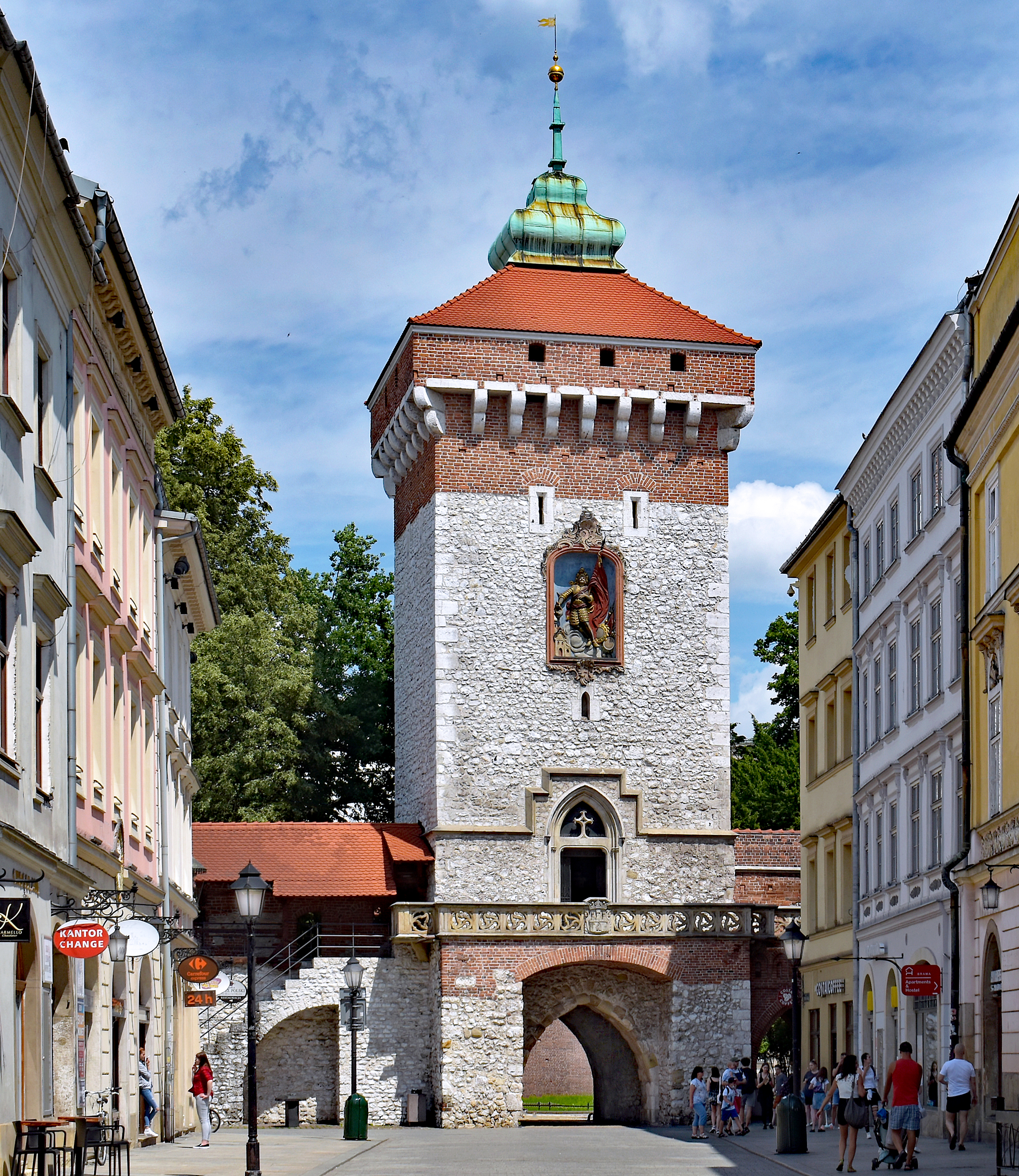
St. Florian's Gate at the northernmost end of the street

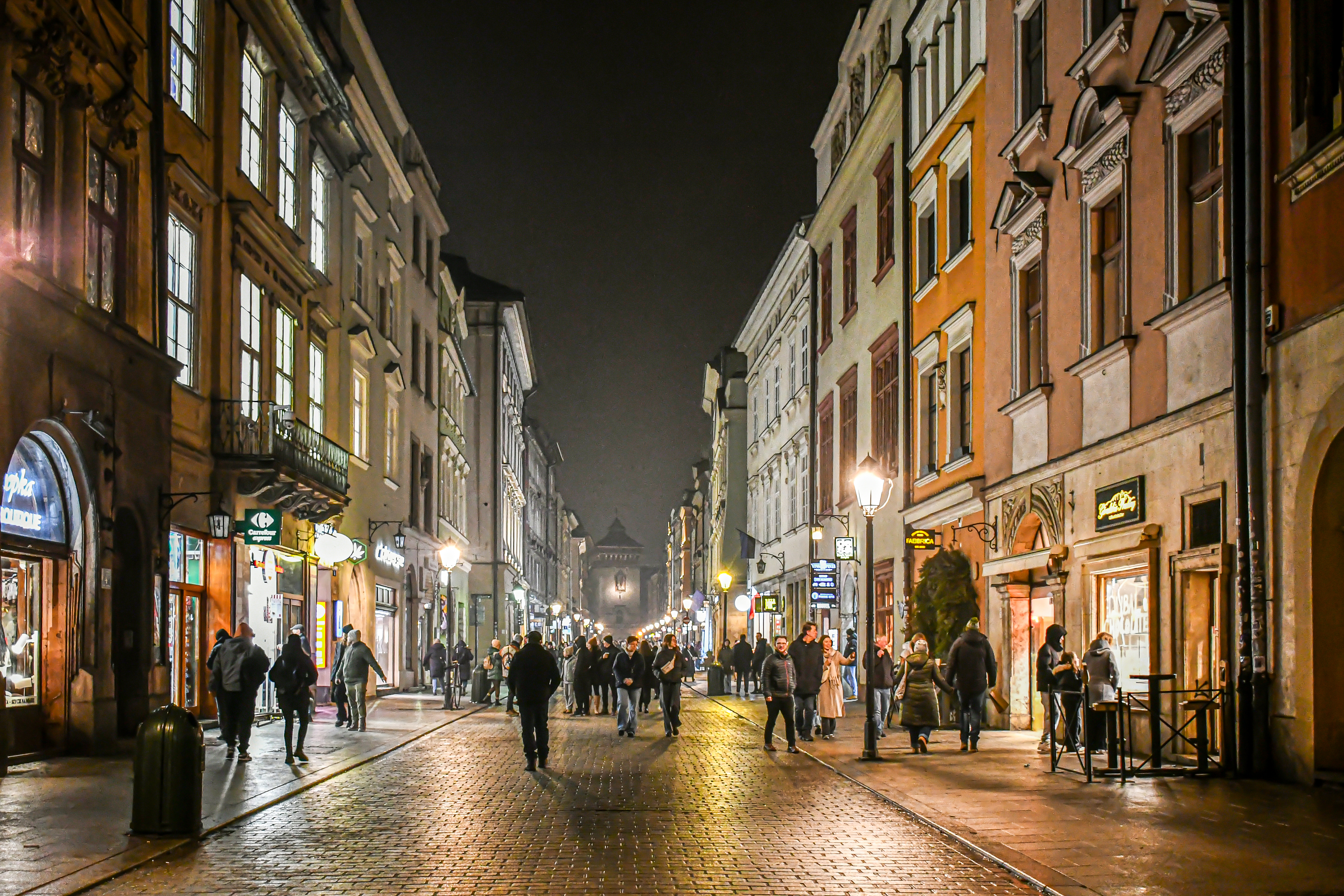
View from S by night (2025)

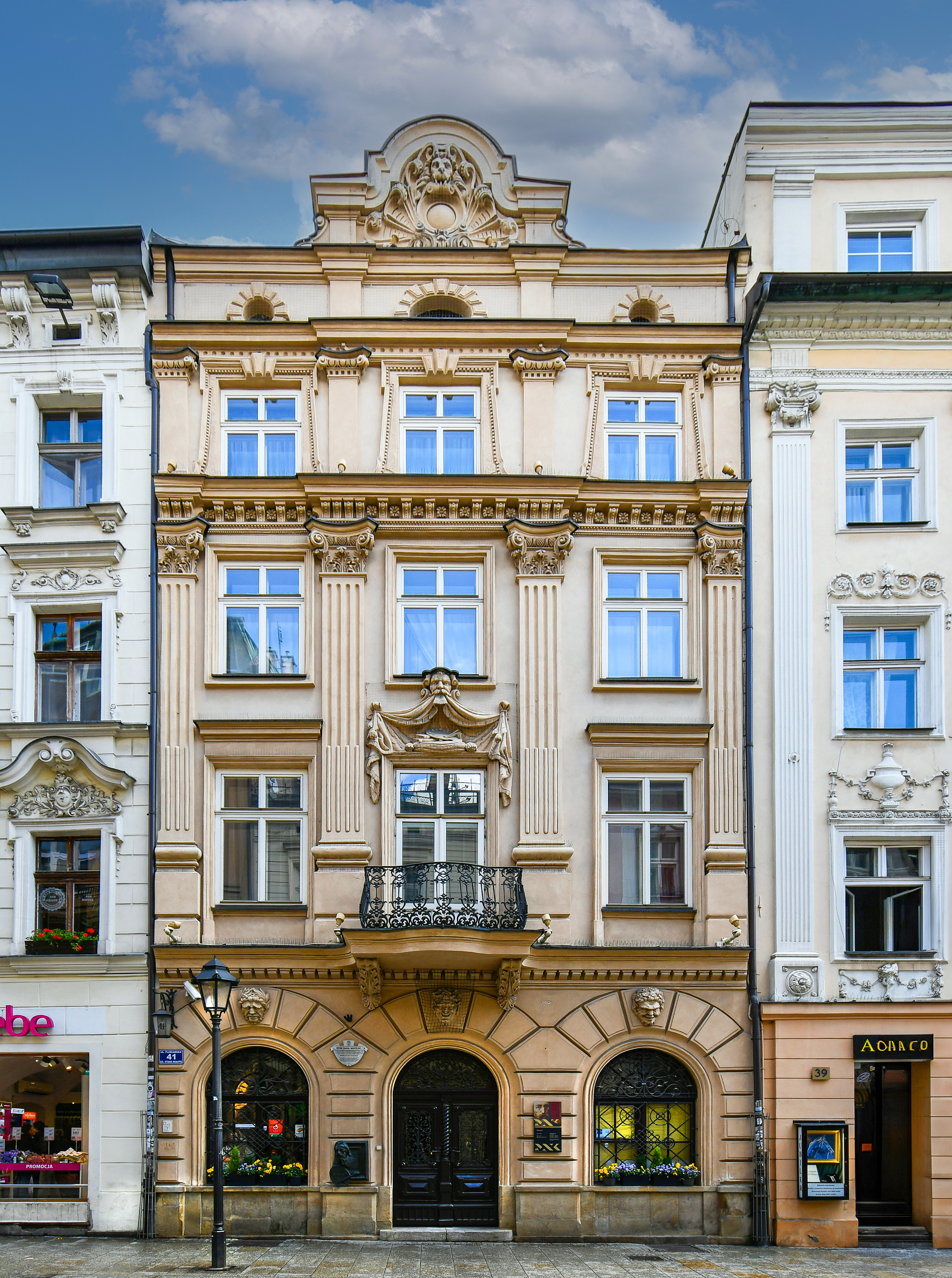
41 Floriańska Str
Jan Matejko House
