= Konstanty Górski =

Polish painter and illustrator

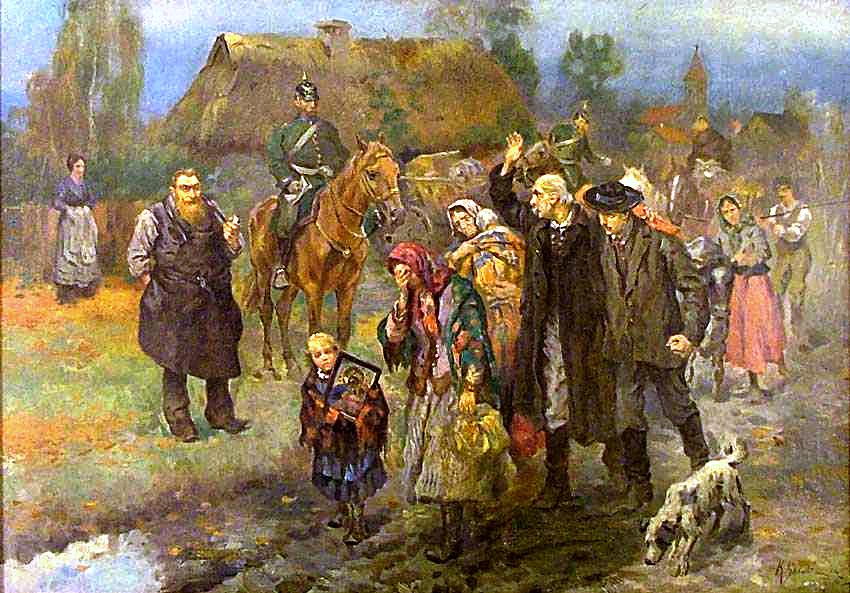
"The Prussian deportations", 1915, oil on double canvas by Konstanty Górski

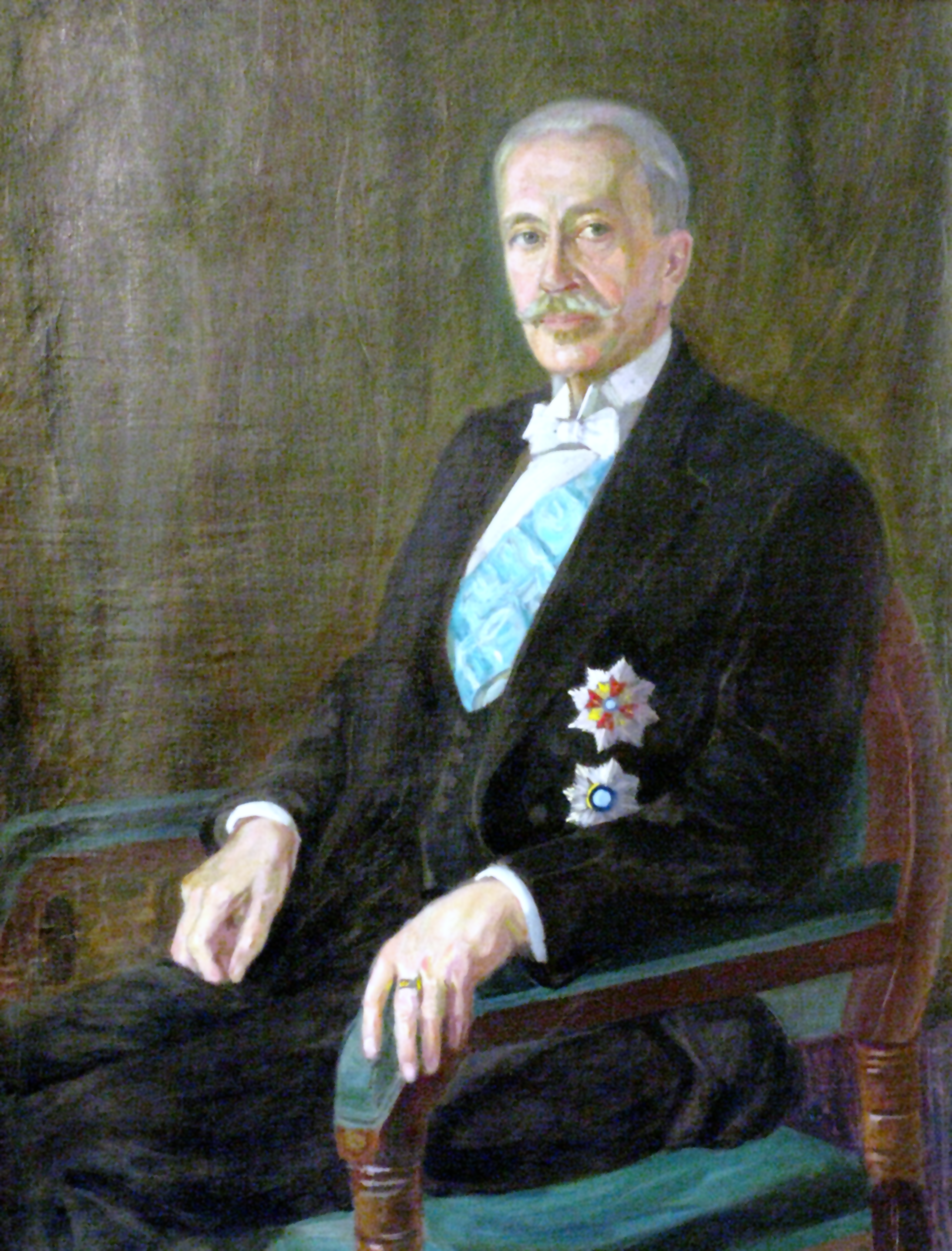
President of Poland Ignacy Mościcki by Konstanty Górski

Konstanty Gorski or Górski (1868–1934) was a Polish painter and illustrator, born in a partitioned Poland which was deprived of independence. Gorski studied painting at the Moscow school of fine arts, and at the Petersburg Academy. After 1889, he continued his studies in France, Italy and Munich. Gorski returned to his occupied homeland in 1895 and settled in Warsaw, where he became active in the local artistic circle. His paintings, strongly based on the late 19th-century aesthetic ideals of realism, comprise numerous portraits, paintings with patriotic themes of regional nature, and historical scenes. As an illustrator, Gorski cooperated with Polish language periodicals such as Wędrowiec (the Wanderer), Tygodnik Ilustrowany weekly, and Tygodnik Polski (the Polish Weekly). Gorski died in 1934, 15 years after Poland's return to independence.
