= Matejko (surname) =

Matejko is a Polish surname originated from a diminutive for the given name Matej (Matthew). Notable people with the surname include:

- Helena née Matejko, daughter of Jan and Teodora Matejko
- Jan Matejko (1838–1893), Polish painter
- Teodora Matejko, wife of Jan Matejko
- Theo Matejko (1893–1946), Austrian illustrator
- Franciszek Ksawery Matejko, Czech-Polish musician, father of Jan Matejko

== See also ==
- Matejka
