= Edmund Matejko =

Polish insurgent and teacher, older brother of Jan Matejko

Edmund Marcin Matejko
- Born: November 12, 1829; Kraków
- Died: July 2, 1907 (aged 77); Kraków
- Occupations: agronomist, teacher
- Spouse: Klara Witaszewska
- Parents: Franciszek Ksawery Matejko (father); Joanna Karolina Rossberg (mother)
- Relatives: 2 sisters and 9 brothers (including Jan Matejko)

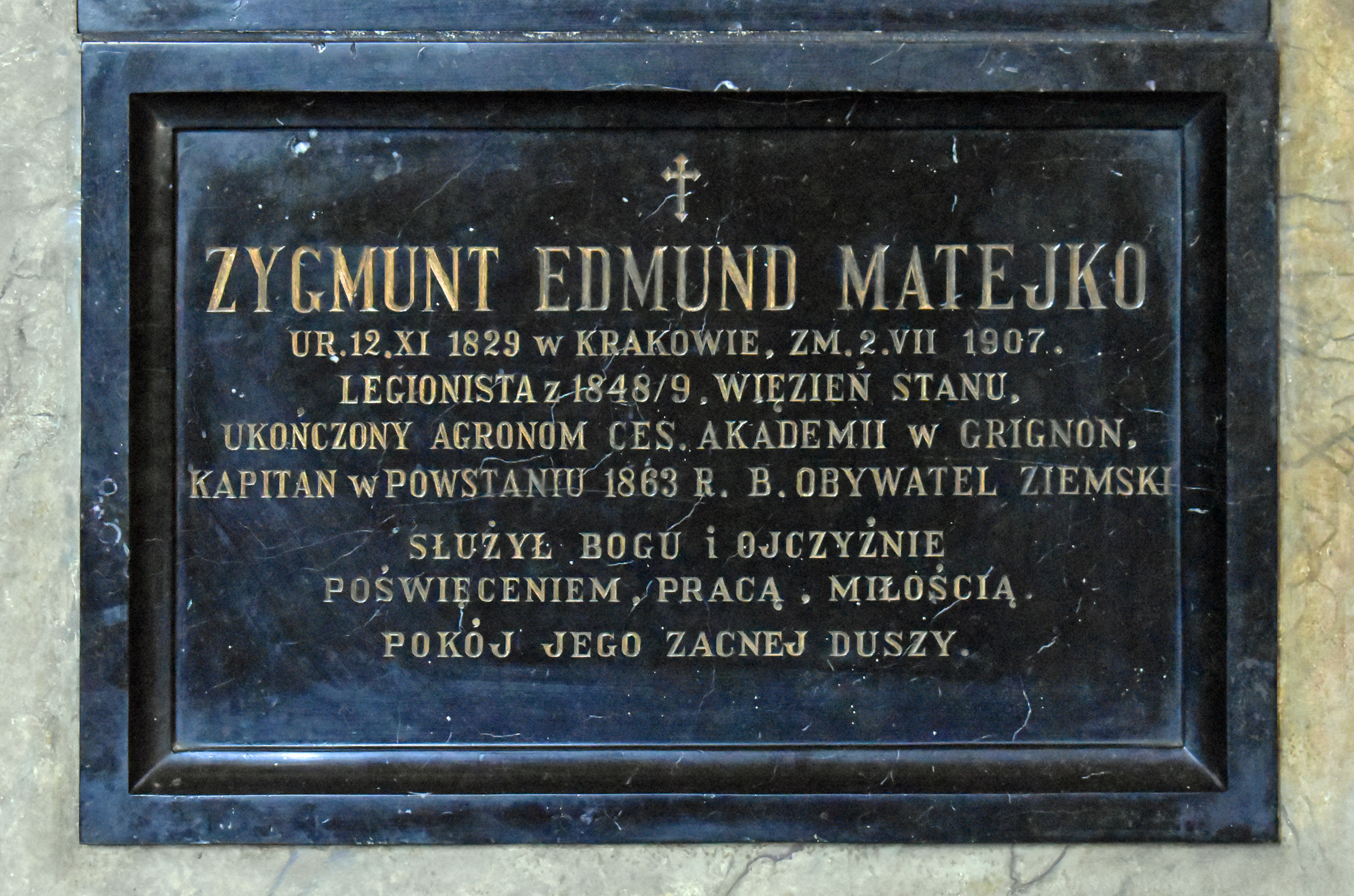
Commemorative plaque for Edmund Matejko is located in the Church of the Visitation of the Blessed Virgin Mary in Kraków

Edmund Marcin Matejko, also known as Zygmunt Matejko (12 November 1829 – 2 July 1907), was a Polish insurgent, agronomist and teacher. He was participant in the Hungarian Revolution of 1848 and the January Uprising, tenant of landed estates (including Bieńczyce), and teacher at an agricultural school in Czernichów. He was the older brother of the painter Jan Matejko and the younger brother of the librarian and Slavic historian Franciszek Matejko.

He was a graduate of the St. Anna's High School and studied at the Jagiellonian University for several years. During the Spring of Nations, he was involved in conspiratorial activities and, fearing arrest, moved to Hungary, where he took part in battles against the Austrian army. After their conclusion, he returned to Galicia, where he was arrested but managed to escape and go into exile – first to Greater Poland, then to France. He returned to Polish lands in the late 1850s and participated in the January Uprising. After its conclusion, he focused on managing landed estates.

== Biography ==
=== Origins and youth ===
Edmund Matejko was born on 12 November 1829 in Kraków. He was the second child of Franciszek Ksawery Matejko (1793–1860), a Czech immigrant from the Hradec Králové area, and his wife Joanna Rosberg (1802–1845), the daughter of a German saddler who had settled in Kraków. Edmund was educated at the St. Anna's High School, (Note: Kozłowski (1975, p. 182) states the name of the school as "St. Anna's Gymnasium", but this is an incorrect entry.) from which he graduated with a high school diploma. In 1845, he began his studies at the Jagiellonian University, initially studying philosophy before enrolling in the Faculty of Law. Two years later, he began studying painting at the Kraków Academy of Fine Arts.

=== Spring of Nations ===
Edmund Matejko did not complete his studies in Kraków due to his involvement in political events. In 1848, during the Spring of Nations, he became embroiled in a conspiracy, most likely aimed at freeing recruits taken into the Austrian army. Threatened with arrest, he left Kraków with his younger brother Zygmunt (Note: Zygmunt Hilary (born 29 April 1831, died 22 June 1849), the third of the Matejko siblings, also graduated from the St. Anna's High School and in 1847 began studies at the Faculty of Philosophy at the Jagiellonian University. He showed artistic talent – his drawings, including copies of portraits of Tadeusz Kościuszko, Prince Józef Poniatowski, and a Krakus scythe-bearer, were kept in the family home. He was also interested in poetry and was remembered by his younger brother Jan as a childhood playmate. Zygmunt died in the Battle of Martin, according to family tradition, cut down by Russian forces when he refused to surrender (Kozłowski (1975, p. 182); Szypowska (1988, p. 347); Gorzkowski (1993, pp. 79, 159, 379); Kovács (1999, p. 522); Słoczyński (2000, p. 17); Miezian (2014, p. 16); Antecka & Buyko (2014, p. 114); Kovács (2016, p. 450)). However, historical sources suggest he likely fell, perhaps while reaching for a weapon, at the very beginning of a Cossack attack that took the entire Hungarian unit by surprise (Kovács (1999, p. 520)). Alternatively, he may have suffered a fatal wound and died in the city hospital after the battle (Kovács (2016, p. 450)). He was buried in the cemetery in Martin, and his gravestone survived until the 1880s (Kovács (2016, p. 451)).) and went to Hungary at the end of that year or in May 1849. The Matejko brothers joined the unit of Hipolit Kuczyński, initially part of the German legion stationed in Dolný Kubín, under the command of Major Ármin Görgey. As the unit grew in size, it became an independent Polish legion. The Hungarian commander, operating in the regions of the Árva and Turóc counties, received orders from Józef Wysocki to send this unit to him to be incorporated into the Polish Legion. However, he delayed the execution of the order due to the threat of a Russian attack. After the defeat at Martin, the surviving Poles joined Wysocki's unit. (Note: Kozłowski (1975, p. 182) and Antecka & Buyko (2014, p. 114) only state that the Matejko brothers served in the ranks of the Polish Legion.)

During the campaign, the brothers fought in the battles of Bánffyhunyad, over the Váh river, and at Martin, where Zygmunt died in the spring of 1849. Edmund survived and ended up in Transylvania, (Note: Kovács (1999, p. 529) suggests that in Transylvania, he arrived as a companion of Wysocki's courier, Captain Edward Antoni Żarski. He is believed to have reached the region in July 1849.) where he joined the units of Józef Bem. Serving in the 2nd Battalion of the Transylvanian Legion, he earned the rank of lieutenant. After the failure of the Hungarian Revolution, he tried to return to Galicia but was captured by the Austrians while attempting to cross into those territories or possibly in Kraków itself. Sent to a penal company at the Komárno fortress, he escaped from the prisoner transport near Mogilany. He hid for a time in Klecza Górna, and then left Galicia, traveling to Greater Poland. He found employment on the estate of Dezydery Chłapowski in Turew but, harassed by the Prussian police, he decided to leave Polish lands.

=== Emigration and return to the country ===
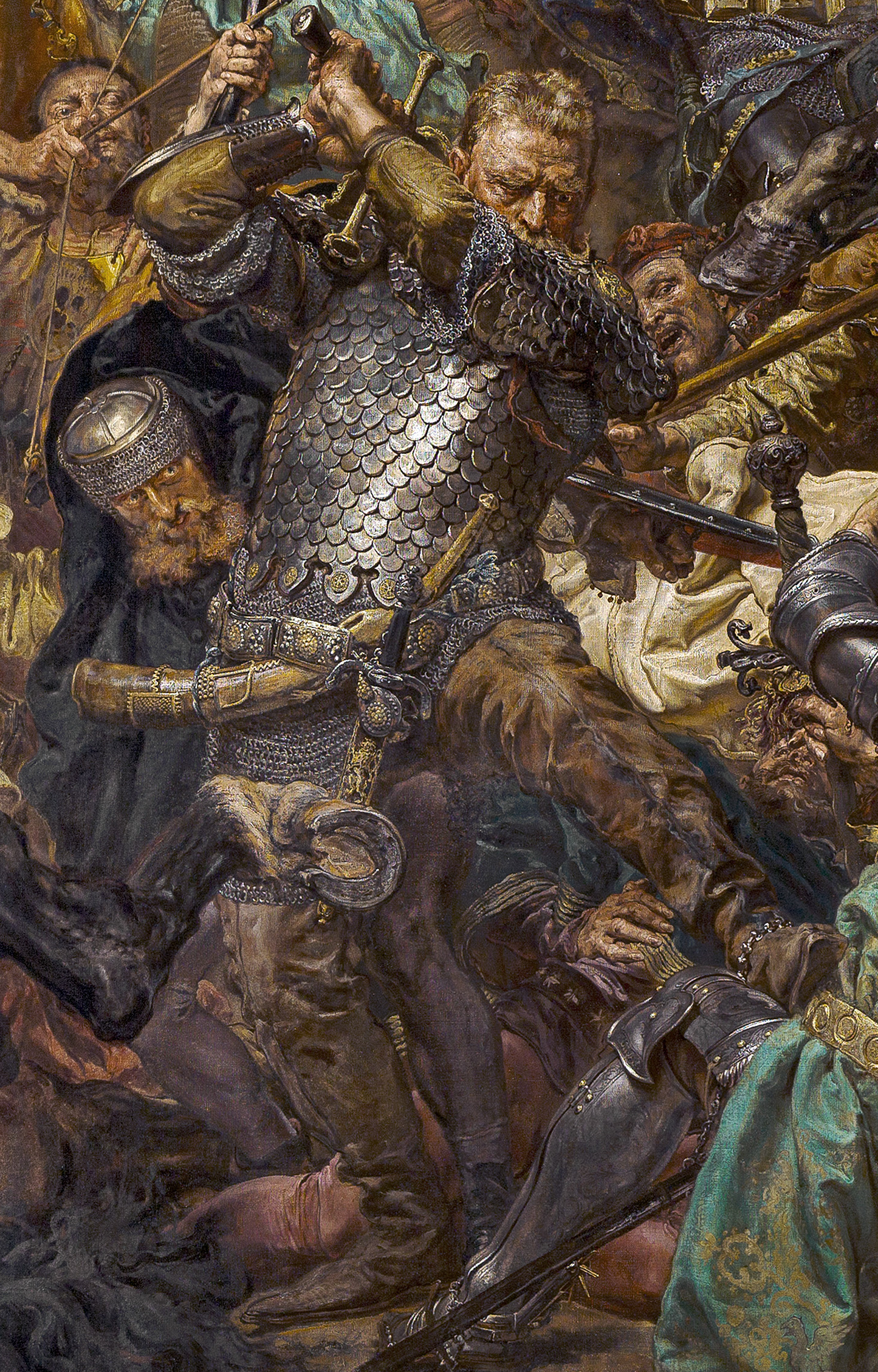
Jan Žižka, a fragment of the painting Battle of Grunwald by Jan Matejko – Edmund Matejko posed for this figure

Matejko emigrated to France, where he first completed his studies at a Polish school in Montparnasse and later graduated with distinction from the agricultural school in Orly near Paris. He maintained correspondence with his family. After a few years, he decided to return, which took place after 1857. Due to the lack of permission to settle in Galicia, he moved to Volhynia, where he leased or managed estates. He subsequently relocated to the Płock Governorate, where he oversaw the properties of Count Wawrzyniec Benzelstjerna Engeström. In 1860, he was elected as a member of the Agricultural Society.

=== January Uprising ===
He returned to Kraków before the outbreak of the January Uprising. Fearing arrest (due to his involvement in the attempted rescue of recruits), he began using the name and documents of his deceased brother. (Note: Szypowska (1988, p. 17) indicates that he began using his brother's identity after returning to Poland.) This led to later biographical accounts confusing the two.

After the insurrection began in the Russian partition, he joined the unit of Colonel Leon Czechowski and Major Władysław Englert, both veterans of the Hungarian campaigns, in February 1863. He achieved the rank of captain and commanded a company of riflemen. After Czechowski's unit suffered defeat on March 20, he returned to Kraków. However, in April of the same year, he once again engaged in armed combat, this time accompanied by his brother Kazimierz. (Note: Kazimierz Wilhelm (born 6 April 1841, died 17 December 1882), the 10th of the Matejko siblings, was cherished by the entire family, who valued his calm demeanor, modesty, and resourcefulness. He fought in the January Uprising until the spring of 1864. He had two sons. After his death, Jan Matejko took on the responsibility of supporting his widow with a monthly financial allowance (Kozłowski (1975, p. 183); Gorzkowski (1993, p. 241); Słoczyński (2000, p. 14); Zgórniak (2004, p. 38); Antecka & Buyko (2014, p. 114)).) They joined the unit of Józef Miniewski. He fought at Krzykawka, where he witnessed the death of Francesco Nullo. (Note: Miezian (2014, p. 16) states that Matejko was taken prisoner by the Russians at that time.) Following the defeat, he returned to Kraków on May 7, where he was arrested for his involvement in the skirmish at Szklary and imprisoned at the Wawel Castle, then part of the Austrian fortress. He was likely released in March 1864.

=== Years after the uprising ===
On 1 April 1864, Edmund Matejko took a position as a teacher of animal husbandry and agricultural administration at the agricultural school in Czernichów, where he taught for a year before resigning. In 1869, he leased the village of Bieńczyce, which belonged to St. Florian's Church in Kraków. He spent the next 24 years there, actively participating in educational and social initiatives. Despite claims that he "managed the estate exemplarily", he did not achieve financial success. He fell into debt, which his brother Jan Matejko helped him repay in the 1880s. Eventually, he gave up his lease. Matejko moved to Kraków, where he spent the remainder of his life. He died on 2 July 1907 and was buried in Rakowice Cemetery.

=== Personal life ===
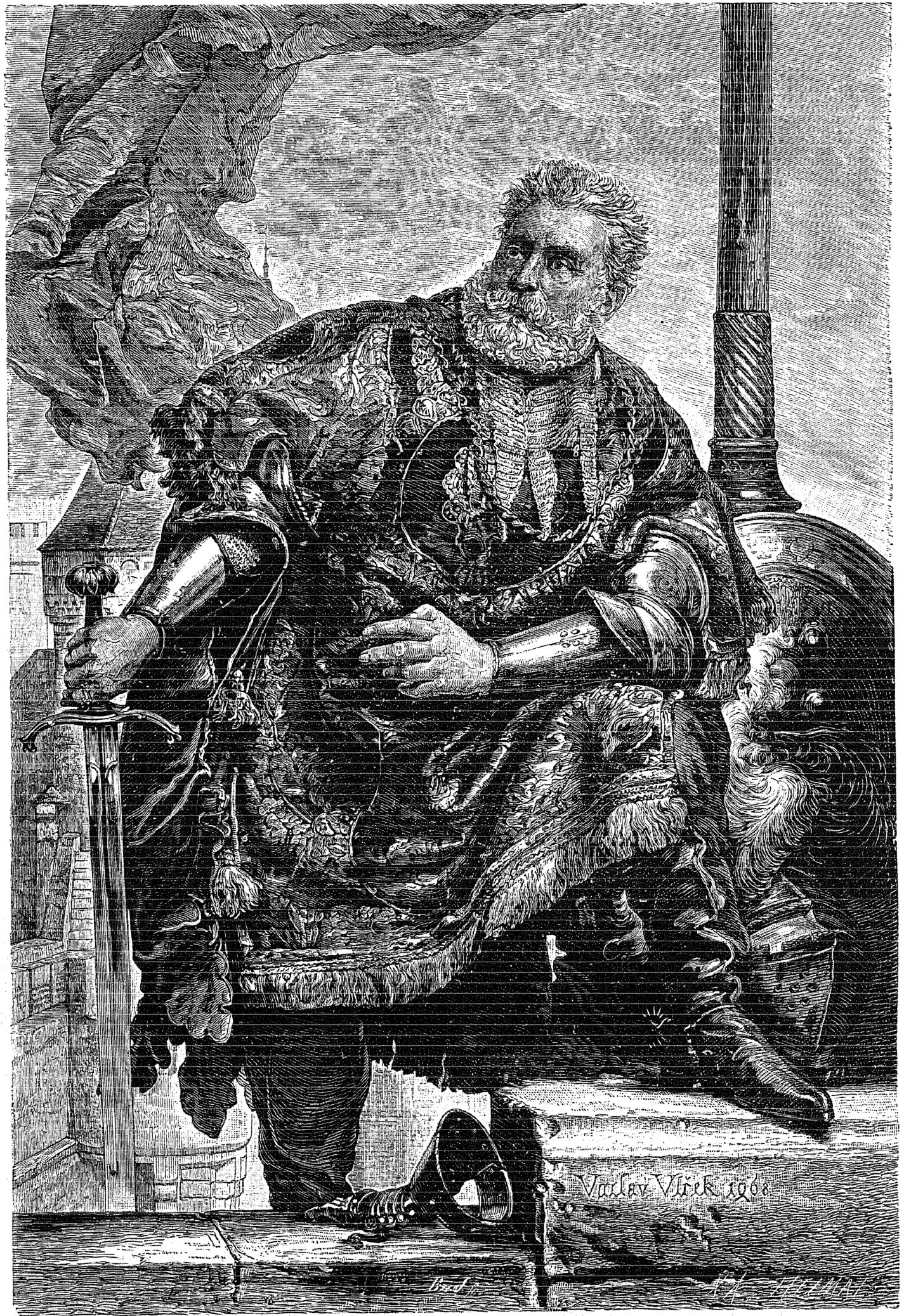
Reproduction of Jan Matejko's painting Wacław Wilczek Defending the Church in Trzebów, for which Edmund also posed

Edmund Matejko married Klara Witaszewska with whom he had two sons.

In Jan Matejko's childhood memories, Edmund is recalled as a caring and supportive brother. According to Marian Gorzkowski, the painter's secretary, Edmund and their eldest sibling, Franciszek, taught Jan to read. After removing his younger brother from St. Barbara's School, where Jan struggled, Edmund successfully prepared him for the entrance exam to St. Anne's High School during the summer of 1848. Letters from Edmund during his time abroad, describing Paris and its art galleries, reportedly inspired the young artist's desire to visit the city. In the spring of 1864, when Edmund was imprisoned in Wawel Castle, Jan intervened to secure better conditions for him, achieving success.

Edmund attended his brother's wedding to Teodora Giebułtowska (still a bachelor at the time, according to Stanisława Serafińska, Teodora's niece), though, like the rest of their siblings, he disapproved of the union. In the summer of 1871, the brothers visited their sibling Franciszek, who was in a mental health facility in Vienna. However, their relationship was not always cordial. In November of the same year, (Note: As stated by Zgórniak (2004, p. 25), the purchase of the townhouse took place in December of that year.) when Jan was purchasing a house on Floriańska Street from his siblings, Edmund resisted and negotiated grudgingly, making snide remarks toward his brother. This did not sever their relationship; in 1876, when Jan purchased an estate in Krzesławice, its proximity to Edmund's leased land in Bieńczyce influenced the decision. Edmund and his family were by Jan's side during his final moments.

According to Gorzkowski, Jan Matejko provided significant financial support to Edmund, including monthly allowances, covering his debts (notably in 1886 and 1892), and even redeeming a promissory note despite facing his financial difficulties. Edmund also reportedly raised one of Jan's sons.

Edmund left behind memoirs and demonstrated some artistic talent. While imprisoned in Wawel, he colored copies of Jan Matejko's album Costumes in Poland, published in 1860. Later, he posed for his brother as Jan Žižka in Battle of Grunwald and as a figure in the painting Wacław Wilczek Defending the Church in Trzebów.

== Bibliography ==
- Antecka, Jolanta; Buyko, Małgorzata (2014). Teodora, moja miłość. Życie codzienne Jana i Teodory Matejków [Teodora, My Love: The Daily Life of Jan and Teodora Matejko] (in Polish). Olszanica: Bosz. ISBN 978-83-7576-206-8.
- Gorzkowski, Marian (1993). Nowacki, Kazimierz; Trybowski, Ignacy (eds.). Jan Matejko. Epoka od r. 1861 do końca życia artysty z dziennika prowadzonego w ciągu lat siedemnastu [Jan Matejko: The Era from 1861 to the Artist's Death Based on a Diary Kept for Seventeen Years] (in Polish). Kraków: Towarzystwo Przyjaciół Sztuk Pięknych w Krakowie. ISBN 83-7052-167-3.
- Kovács, István (2016). Honwedzi, emisariusze, legioniści: słownik biograficzny uczestników Wiosny Ludów na Węgrzech [Honveds, Emissaries, Legionaries: A Biographical Dictionary of the Participants in the Hungarian Revolution of 1848] (in Polish). Translated by Snopek, Jerzy. Kraków: Polska Akademia Umiejętności. ISBN 978-83-7676-249-4.
- Kovács, István (1999). Polacy w węgierskiej Wiośnie Ludów 1848–1849. "Byliśmy z Wami do końca" [Poles in the Hungarian Revolution of 1848–1849: "We Were with You to the End"] (in Polish). Translated by Snopek, Jerzy. Warsaw: Rytm. ISBN 83-87893-15-3.
- Miezian, Maciej (2014). Zapomniane dziedzictwo Nowej Huty. Bieńczyce [The Forgotten Heritage of Nowa Huta: Bieńczyce] (in Polish). Kraków: Muzeum Historyczne Miasta Krakowa. ISBN 978-83-7577135-0.
- Kozłowski, Eligiusz (1975). "Matejko Edmund Marcin". Polski Słownik Biograficzny [Polish Biographical Dictionary] (in Polish). Wrocław-Warsaw-Kraków-Gdańsk: Polska Akademia Nauk Instytut Historii.
- Słoczyński, Henryk (2000). Matejko (in Polish). Wrocław: Wydawnictwo Dolnośląskie. ISBN 83-7023-820-3.
- Szypowska, Maria (1988). Jan Matejko wszystkim znany [Jan Matejko Known to All] (in Polish) (5th ed.). Warsaw: Zarząd Krajowy Związku Młodzieży Wiejskiej.
- Zgórniak, Marek (2004). Jan Matejko 1838–1893. Kalendarium życia i twórczości [Jan Matejko 1838–1893: A Chronology of Life and Work] (in Polish). Kraków: Muzeum Narodowe w Krakowie. ISBN 83-89424-21-5.
