= Matejka =

Matějka (feminine Matějková) is a Czech surname.
Matejka (feminine Matejková) is a Slovak surname.

Notable people include:

- Adrian Matejka, American poet
- Alena Matejka, Czech sculptor
- Alice Matějková, Czech athlete
- Alphonse Matejka, Swiss interlinguist
- František Xaver Matějka, Czech musician
- James J. Matejka Jr., American philatelist
- Jozef Ján Matejka, Slovak writer
- Ladislav Matějka, Czech linguist
- Ludmila Seefried-Matějková, Czech sculptor
- Lukáš Matejka, Slovak ice hockey player
- Lukáš Matějka, Czech footballer
- Mark Matejka, American rock guitarist
- Róbert Matejka, Slovak footballer
- Václav Matějka, Czech film director
- Zdeněk Matějka, Czech chemist

== See also ==
- Matejko (surname)
