= Unierzyski =

Unierzyski is a surname. Notable people with the surname include:

- Józef Unierzyski (1863–1948), Polish painter
- Mariusz Unierzyski (born 1974), Polish footballer
