= Józef Unierzyski =

Polish painter

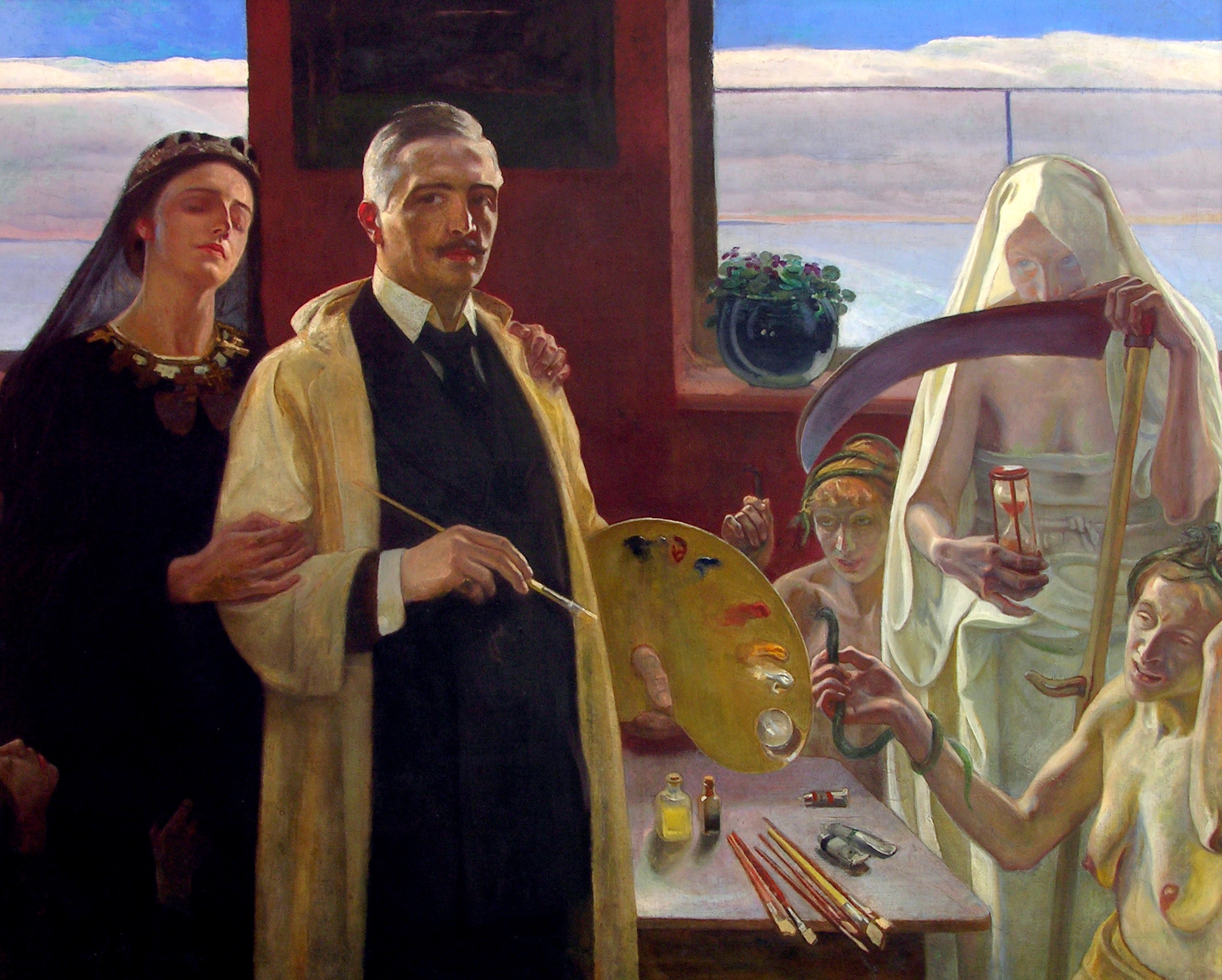
Self-portrait with Harpies (1916)

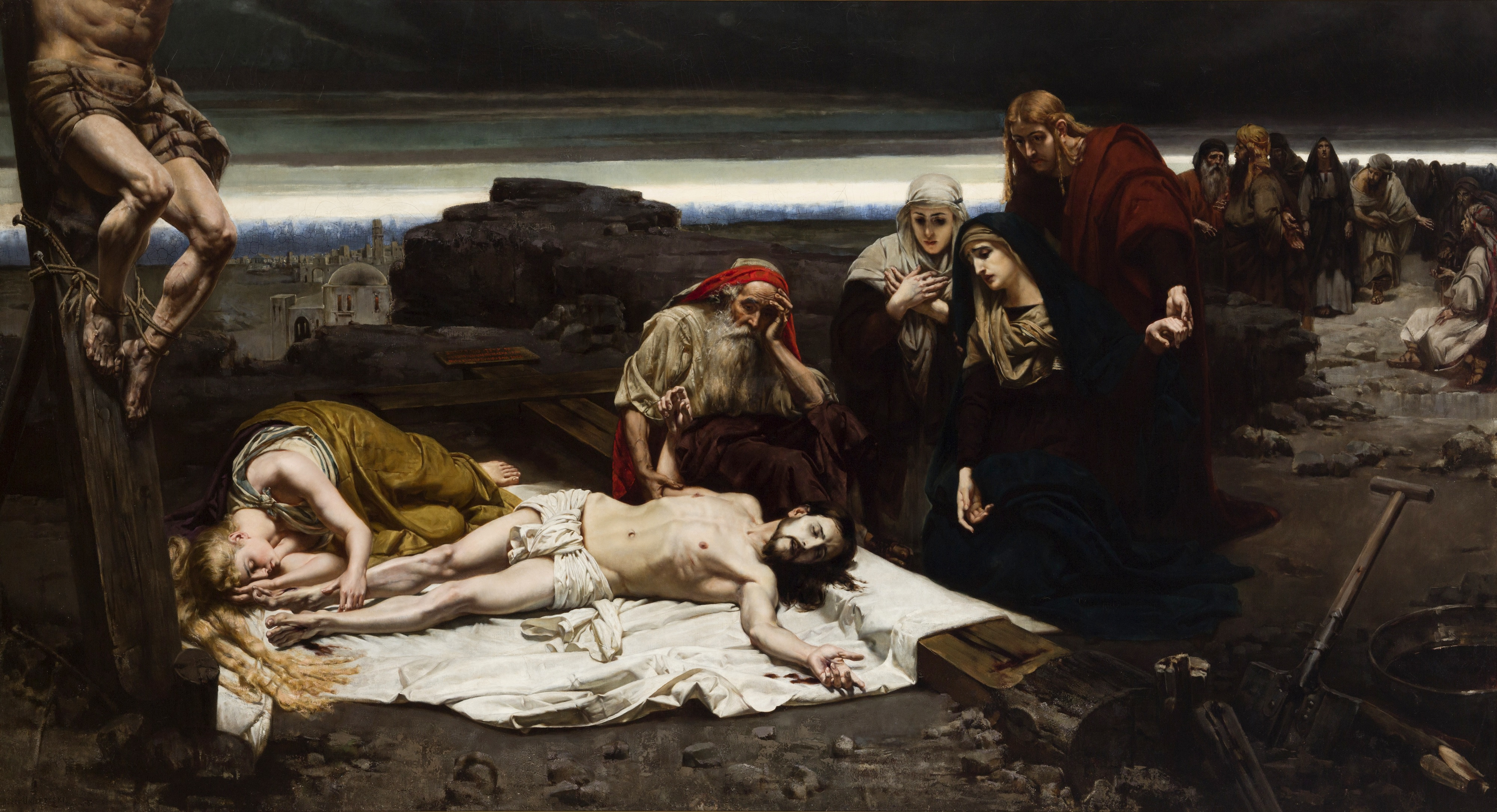
Zdjęcie z krzyża

Józef Unierzyski (20 December 1863, Milewo – 29 December 1948, Kraków) was a Polish painter. From 1891, he served as a professor of drawing at the Jan Matejko Academy of Fine Arts in Kraków.

== Biography ==
He began his studies at the School of Drawing in Warsaw, with Wojciech Gerson and Aleksander Kamiński. Thanks to a scholarship from the Society for the Encouragement of Fine Arts, granted in 1883, he was able to continue his studies in Munich and Italy, where he attended the "Scuola libera" and the Accademia di San Luca in Rome. When he returned to Poland, he studied at the School of Fine Arts with Jan Matejko. Later, he would marry Matejko's daughter, Helena.

He became a deputy assistant at the school in 1889 and became an assistant in 1891. Six years later, he was approved as a professor. In the academic years 1895/96 and 1908/09, he operated his own drawing school. He voluntarily retired in 1909. During World War I, he taught night classes on commission.

Throughout his career, he painted in a modified academic style and remained unimpressed by Modernism. He painted works in a variety of types; including portraits, historical scenes and religious subjects, but also created works with mythological, allegorical and symbolic content.

His most familiar painting, "Zdjęcie z krzyża" (picture or photograph with the Cross, a post-crucifixion scene), from 1887, is on display at the National Museum, Kraków. His works may also be seen at the National Museum, Warsaw, and the Bielsko-Biała Museum and Castle, among others. Several locations have his religious murals, notably including a Marian Cycle of six panels at St. Mary's Church, Katowice.

== Sources ==
- Władysław Prokesch: Józef Unierzyski, Wydawnictwo J. Czernecki, Kraków, Wieliczka 1916
- „Materiały do dziejów Akademii Sztuk Pięknych w Krakowie 1816–1895”, Wrocław 1959, Ed. Józef Dutkiewicz
- „Materiały do dziejów Akademii Sztuk Pięknych w Krakowie 1895–1939”, Wrocław – Warszawa – Kraków 1969, Ed. Józef Dutkiewicz
