= Roudnice =

- Municipality
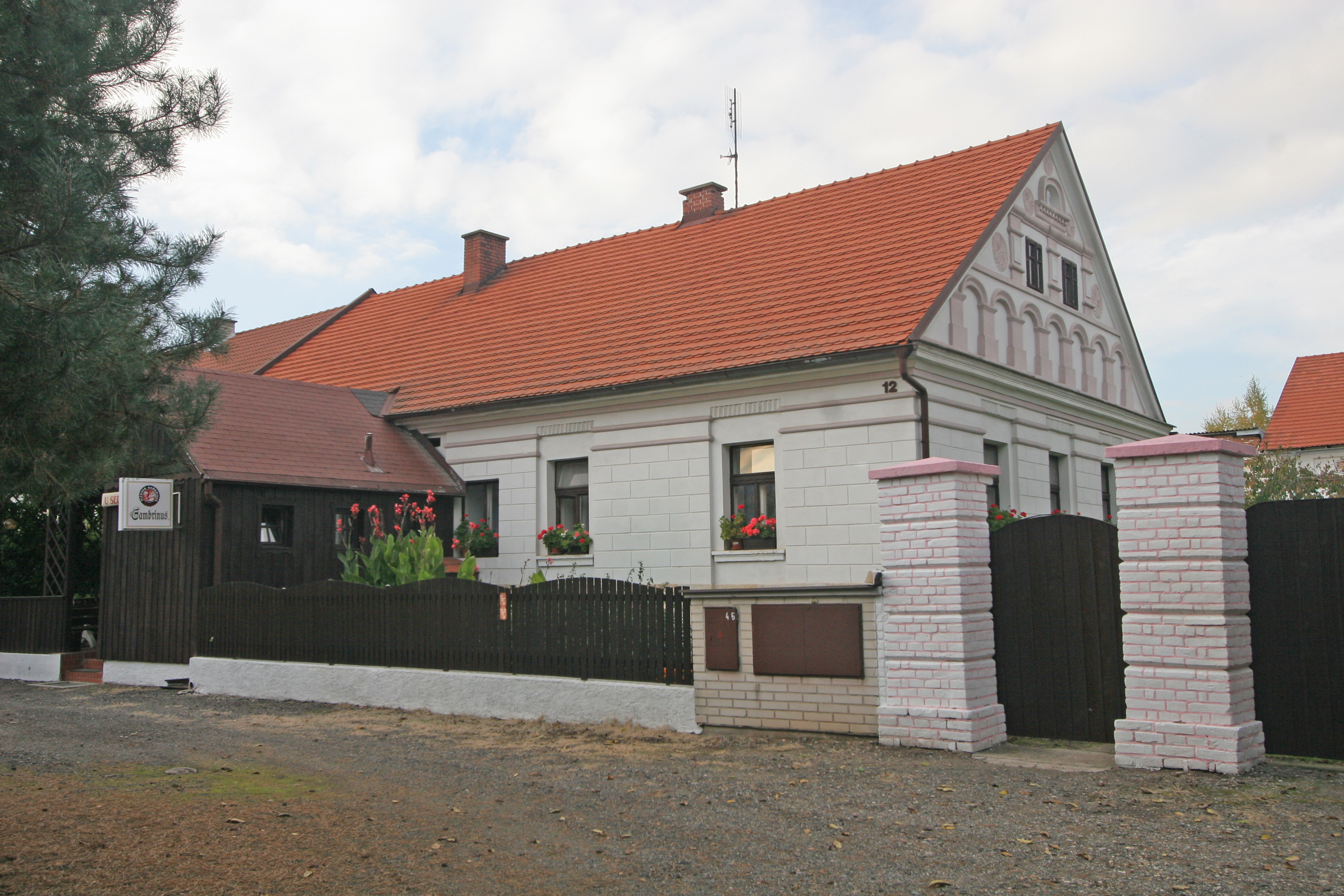
- Homestead, a cultural monument

- Flag Coat of arms

- Location in the Czech Republic
- Coordinates: 50°10′34″N 15°39′6″E
- Country: Czech Republic
- Region: Hradec Králové
- District: Hradec Králové
- First mentioned: 1384

Area
  - Total: 11.08 km^{2} (4.28 sq mi)
- Elevation: 235 m (771 ft)

Population (2026-01-01)
  - Total: 792
  - Density: 71.5/km^{2} (185/sq mi)
- Time zone: UTC+1 (CET)
  - Summer (DST): UTC+2 (CEST)
- Postal code: 503 27
- Website: www.obecroudnice.cz

Roudnice is a municipality and village in Hradec Králové District in the Hradec Králové Region of the Czech Republic. It has about 800 inhabitants.

== Etymology ==
The name is derived from the red shades of colour (in Czech rudá) of the water in the local stream (formerly also called Roudnice), caused by the ore subsoil.

== Geography ==
Roudnice is located about 12 kilometres (7 mi) west of Hradec Králové. It lies in a flat agricultural landscape in the East Elbe Table. There are several lakes created by flooding sand-gravel quarries. The stream Roudnický potok flows through the municipality.

== History ==
The first written mention of Roudnice is from 1384. At the end of the 14th century at the latest, a fortress was built north of the village. In 1513, it was acquired by the Pernštejn family and merged with the Pardubice estate. From 1560 until the abolition of serfdom in 1848, it was a property of the royal chamber.

== Demographics ==
Historical population

Year	Pop.	±%
1869	896	—
1880	1,014	+13.2%
1890	959	−5.4%
1900	922	−3.9%
1910	882	−4.3%

Year	Pop.	±%
1921	867	−1.7%
1930	862	−0.6%
1950	604	−29.9%
1961	569	−5.8%
1970	568	−0.2%

Year	Pop.	±%
1980	528	−7.0%
1991	491	−7.0%
2001	511	+4.1%
2011	622	+21.7%
2021	656	+5.5%

Source: Censuses

== Transport ==
There are no railways or major roads passing through the municipality.

== Sights ==
The only protected cultural monuments in the municipality are two Neoclassical homesteads.

== Notable people ==
- Franciszek Ksawery Matejko (1789/1793–1860), musician and teacher
