= St. Mary's Church, Katowice =

Church building in Katowice, Poland

Coordinates: 50°15′26″N 19°01′49″E

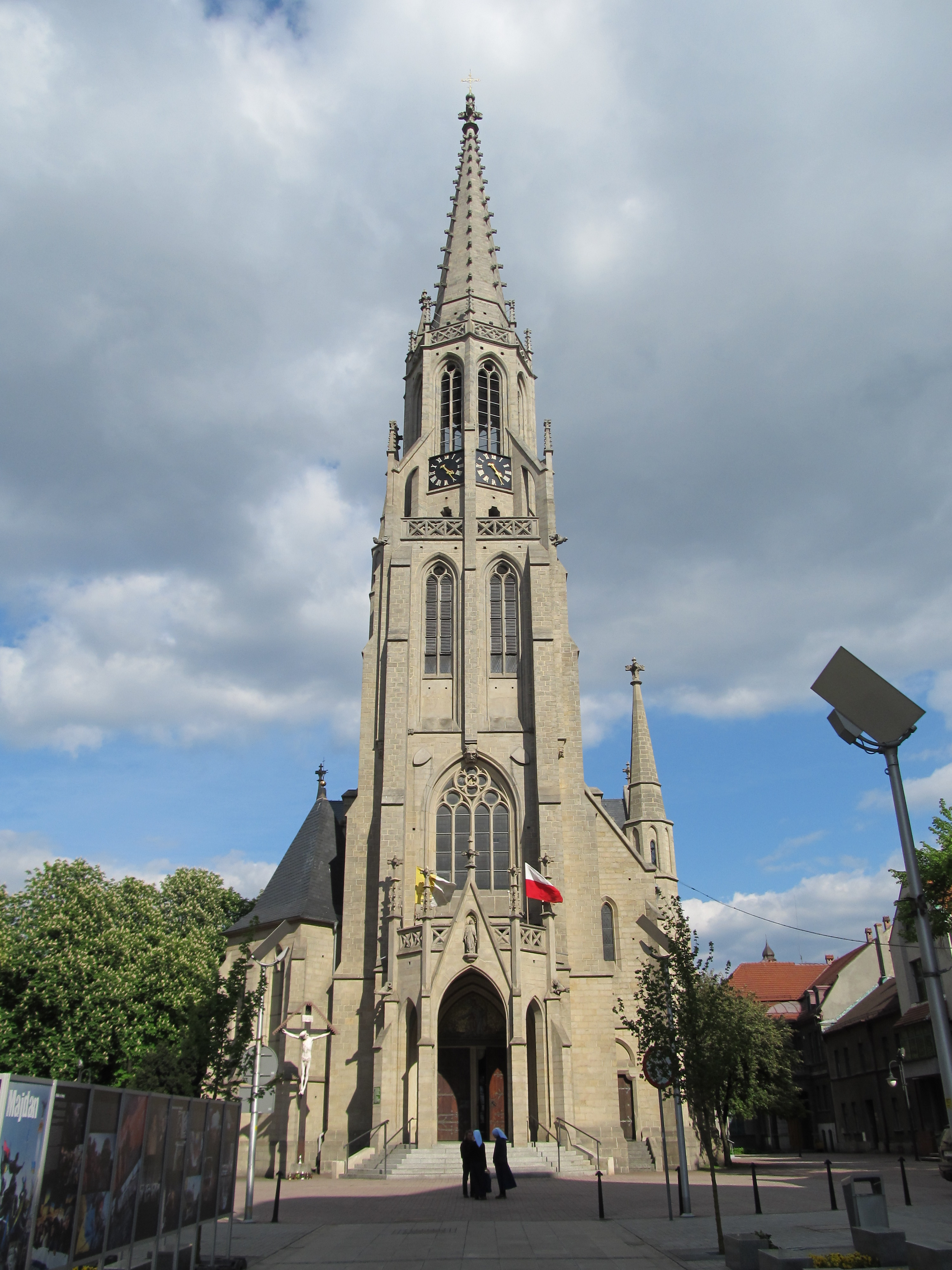
St. Mary's Church in Katowice

St. Mary's Church in Katowice (Polish: Kościół Mariacki w Katowicach) is one of the oldest churches in Katowice, Poland, dating back to 19th century. This neo-Gothic church is located in the Śródmieście district. The architectural design was entrusted to Alexis Langer, a renowned architect from Breslau (Wrocław). Although the original plans envisioned a much grander scale, the final neo-Gothic building spans 43 meters in length and 31 meters in width. Its most distinctive feature is the 71-meter octagonal tower, a signature trademark of Langer's craftsmanship.

== History ==
The plans for establishing the Katowice parish date back to the mid-19th century, during the industrialization of Upper Silesia, leading to rapid population growth in the region. In 1858, the Catholics of Katowice began discussions about relocating a wooden church from Biskupice to Katowice (which was then a village). Meanwhile, a timber framing church was erected, later dismantled. The decision to build a larger church was made by the then-Bishop of Wrocław, Heinrich Förster, who, during a visit to the canon in Racibórz in the spring of 1861, appointed Alexis Langer as the architect. The cornerstone for the construction of the church was consecrated in 1862.

Initially, the concept of the church was quite monumental. Bishop Förster, recognizing the rapid population growth driven by the development of Silesian mining, instructed the architect to design a massive, three-aisled basilica and provided significant financial support for the project. However, the grandiose plan proved too costly for the still relatively small parish, prompting changes to the architectural design. The main alteration was the reduction of the side aisles to a series of chapels placed between buttresses. Ultimately, a four-bay, single-aisled church with a row of side chapels and passages pierced between the buttresses was constructed, giving the impression of aisles.

In the 1970s, the church lost some of its original furnishings, including the main altar and altar rail. In 2001, the stained glass windows underwent thorough conservation.

== Gallery ==
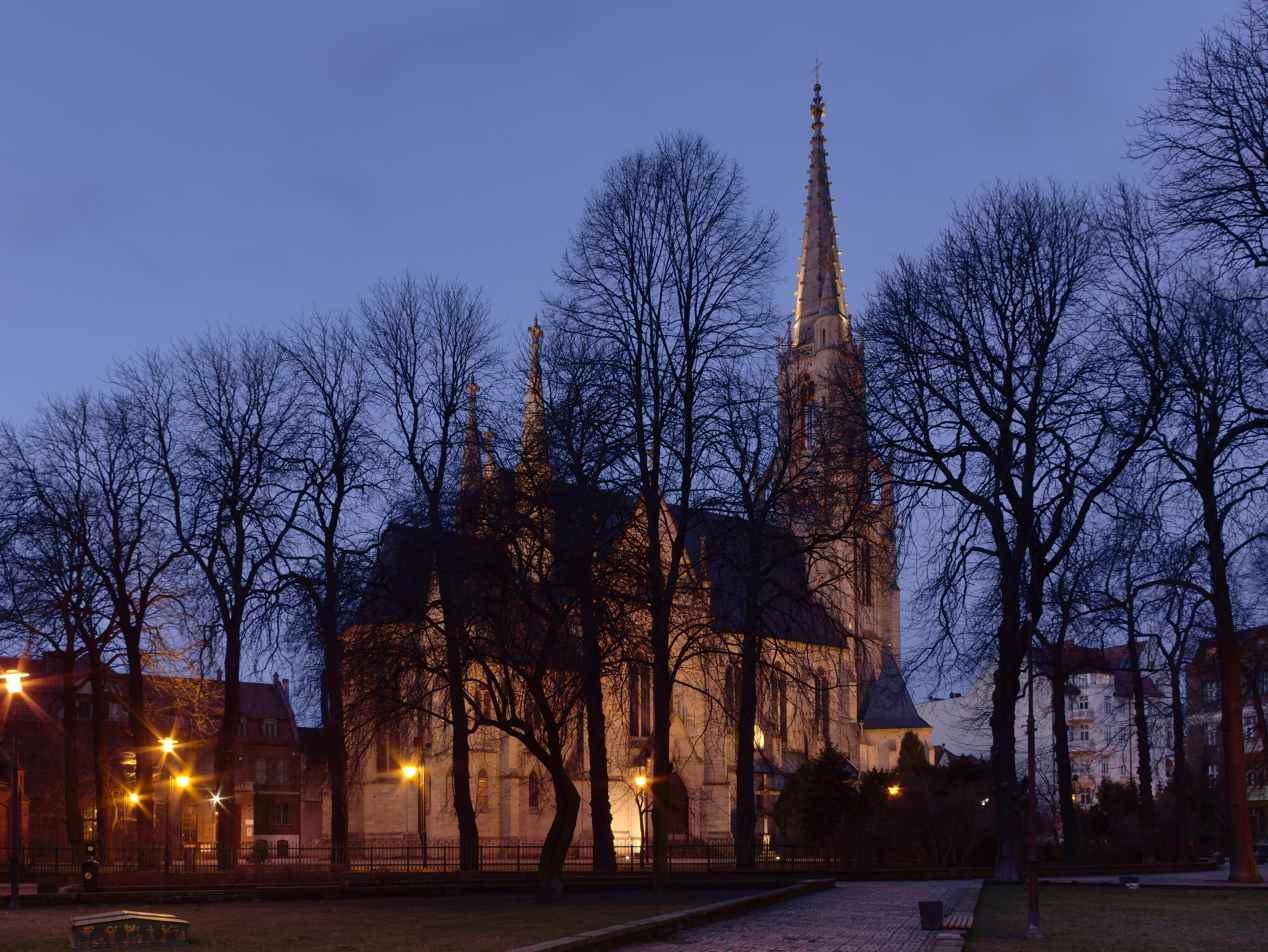
Northern facade (2021)

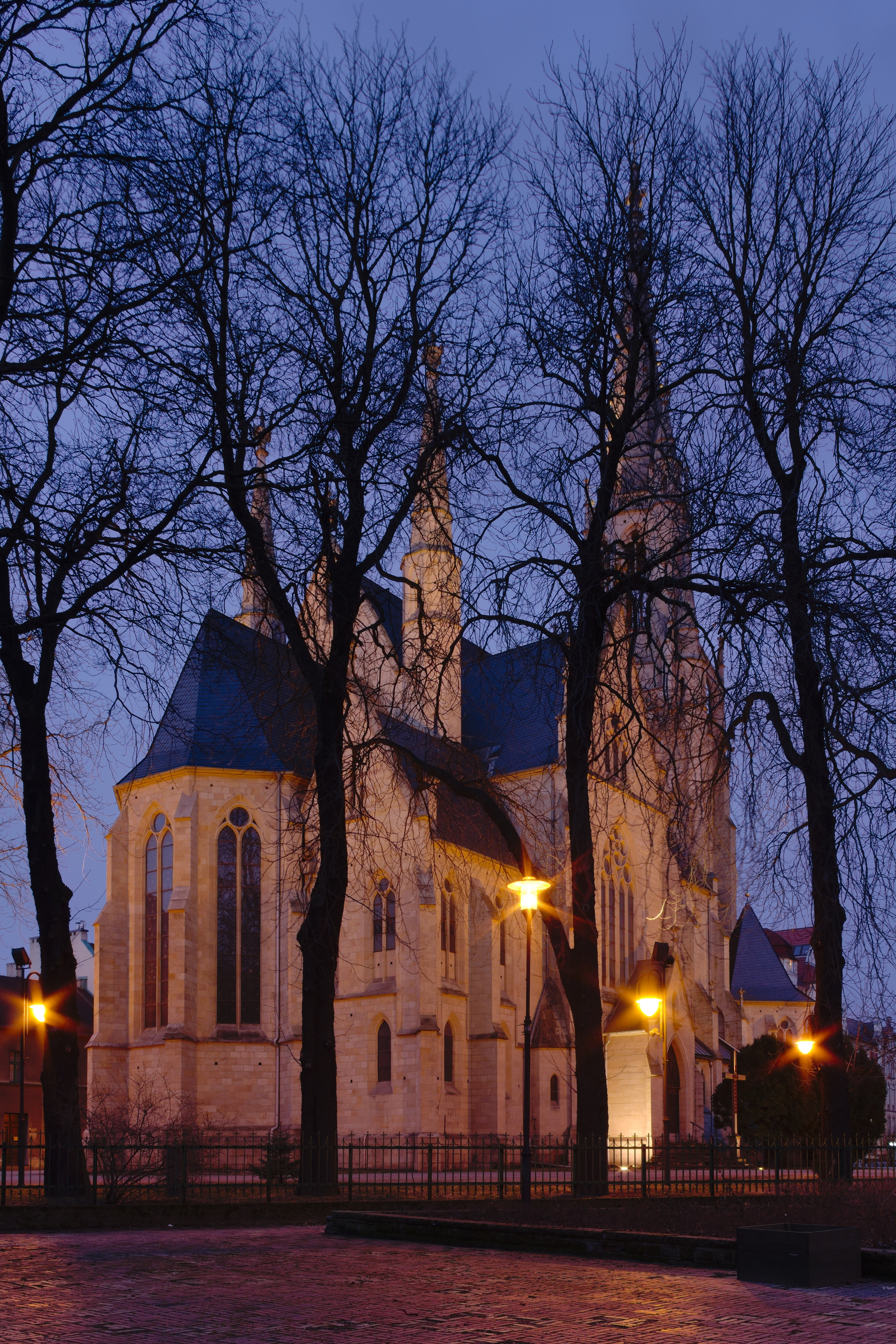
Apsis (2021)

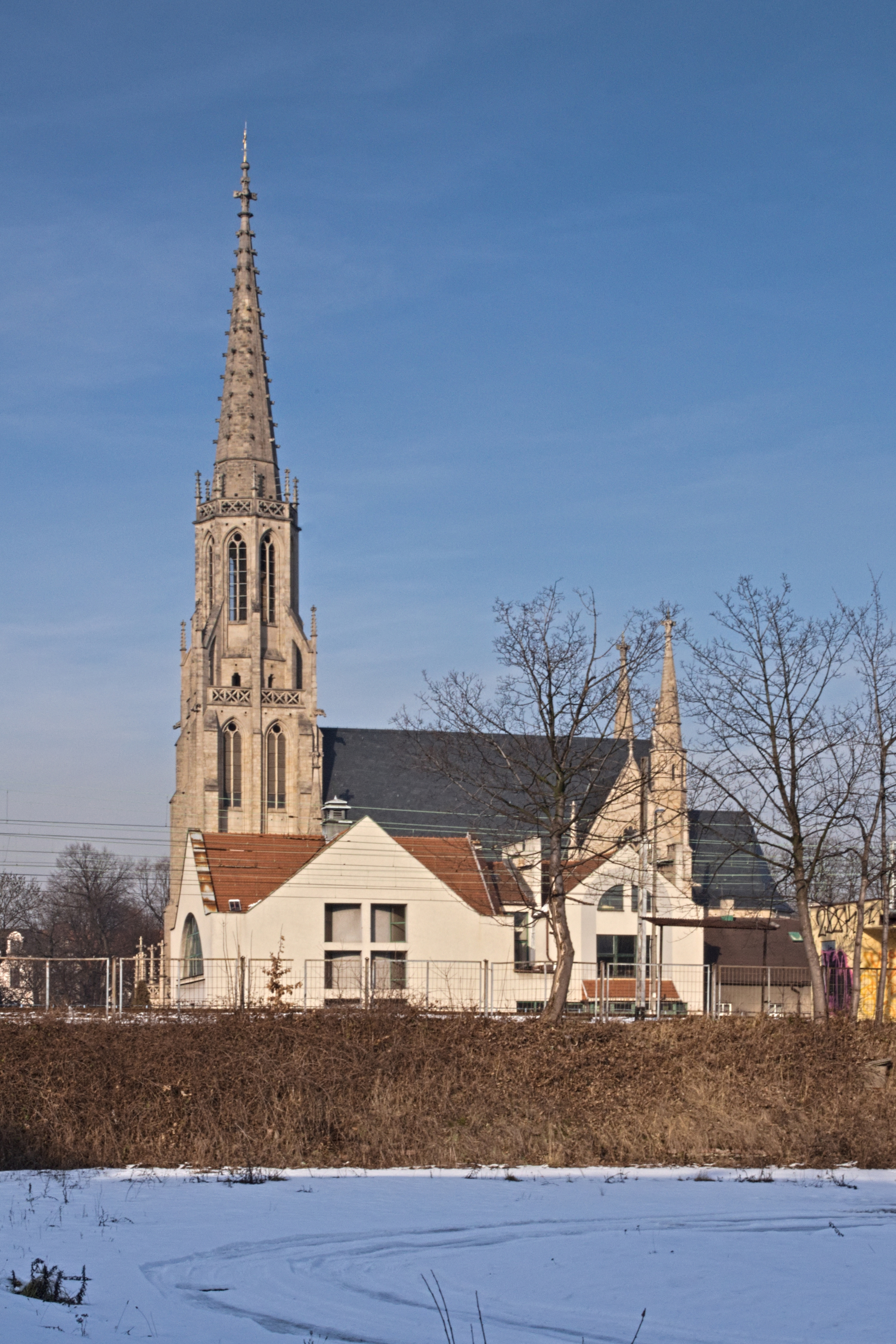
View from the south (2019)

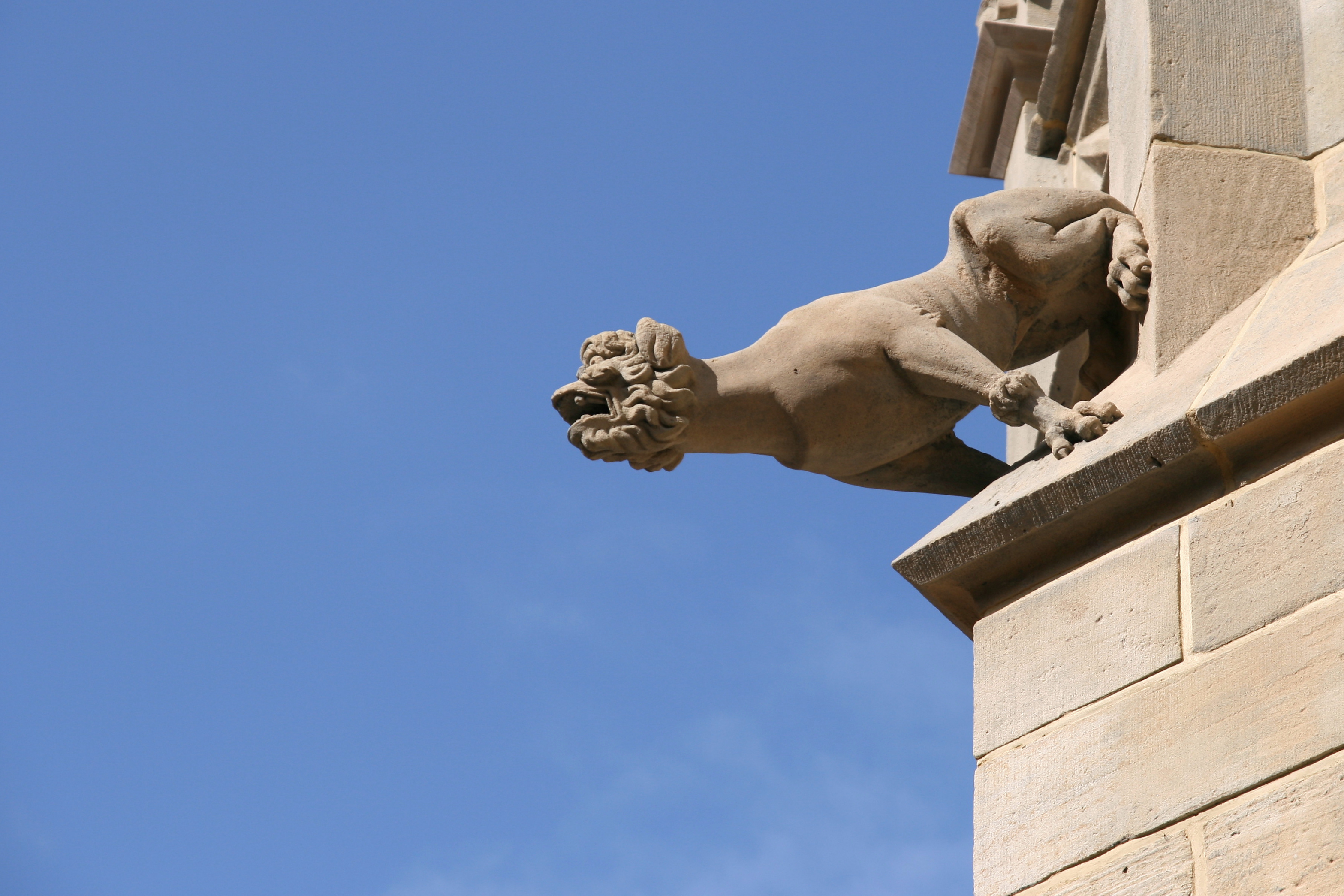
Gargoyle on the tower (2008)

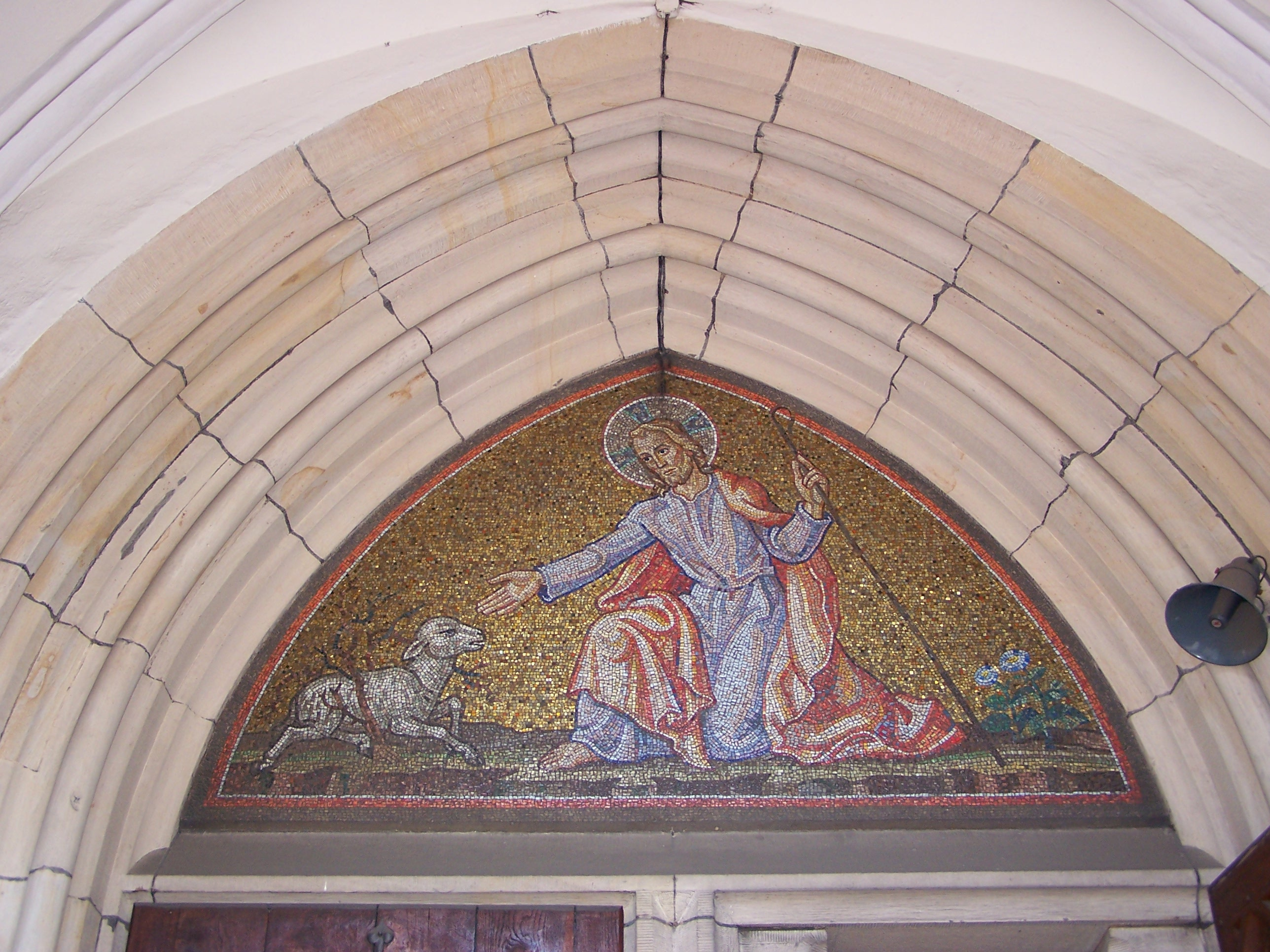
Mosaic above the main entrance (2006)

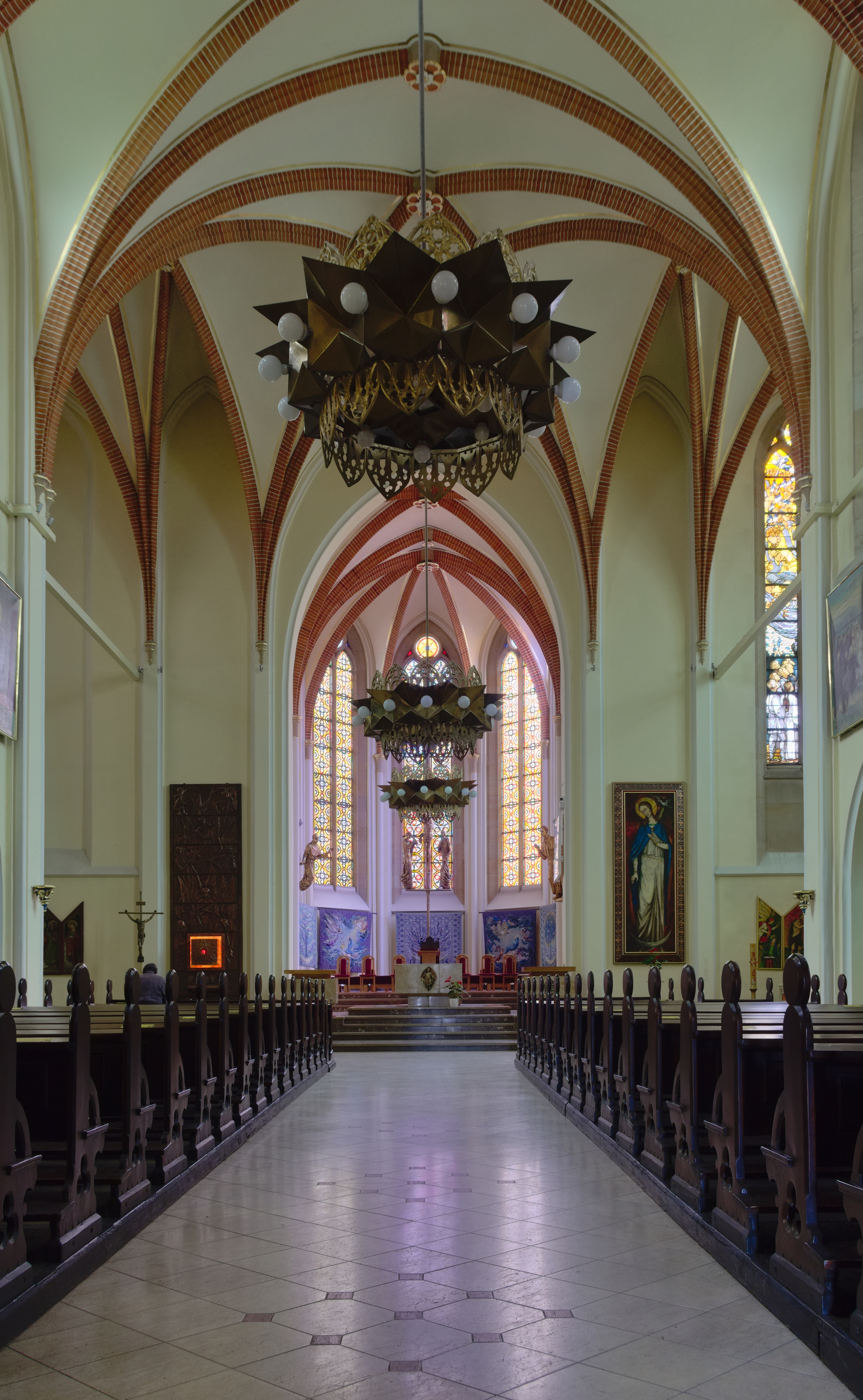
Interior (2021)

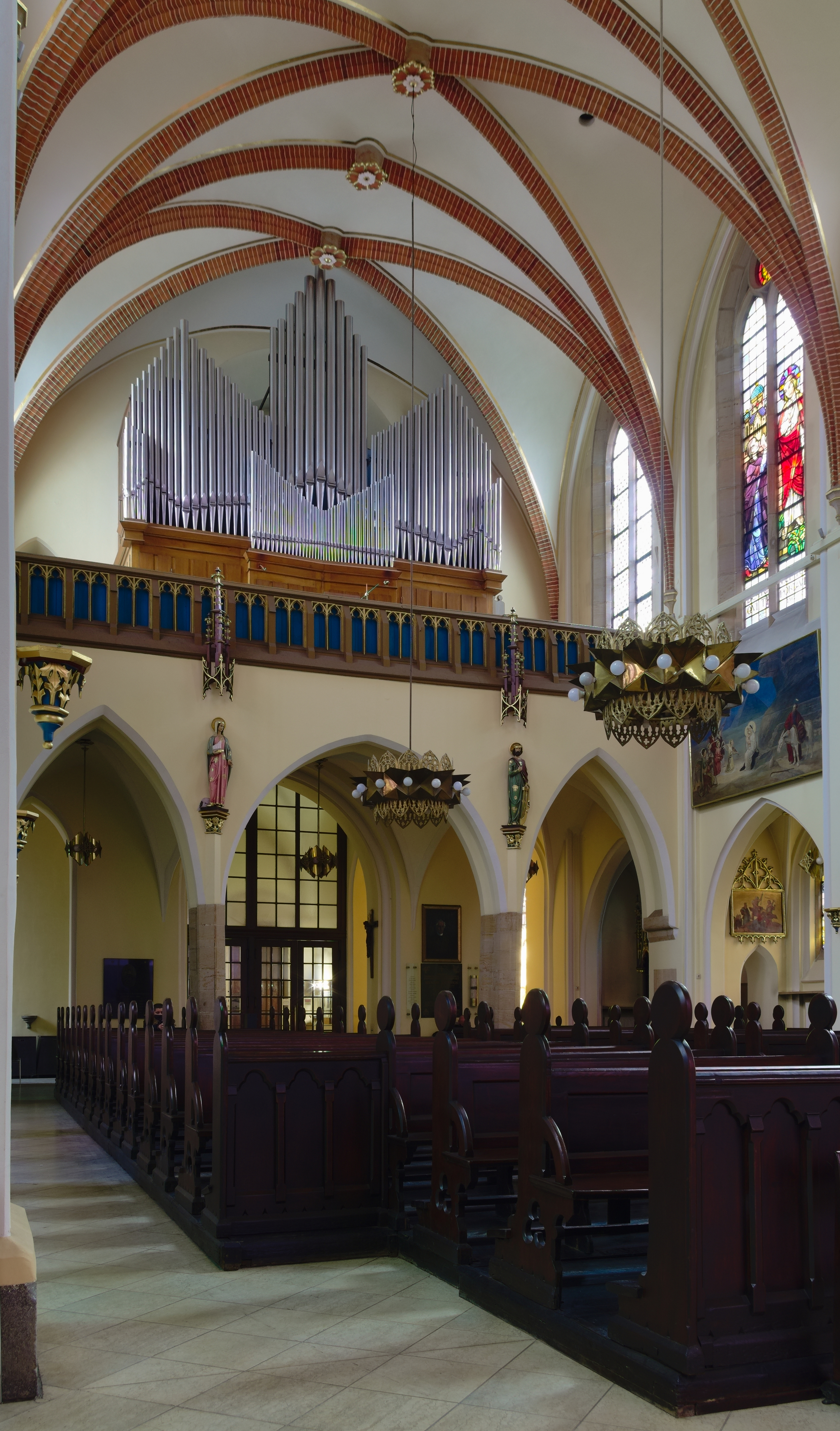
Organ gallery (2021)

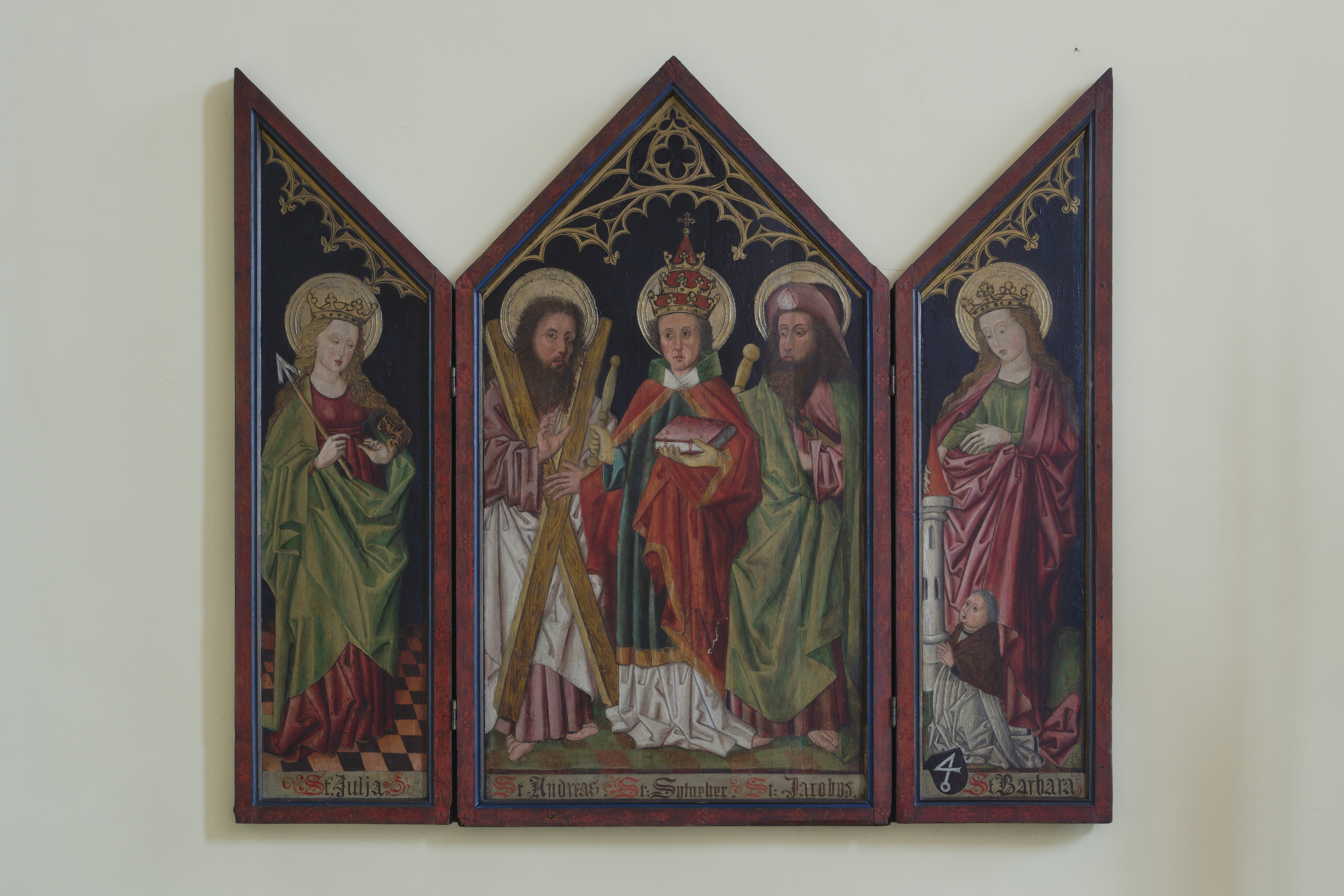
Gothic triptych

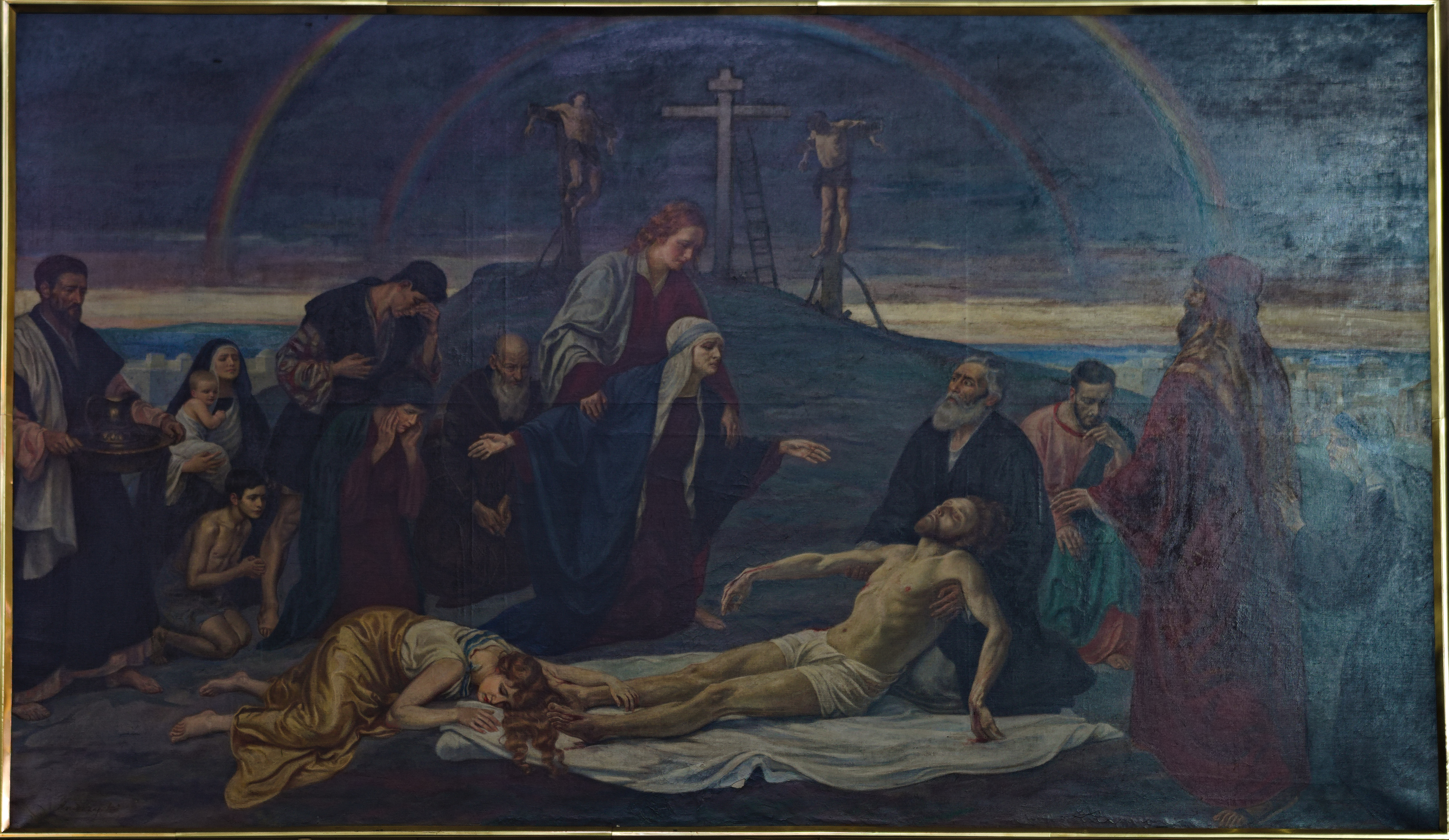
Painting with a motif of the Crucifixion by J. Unierzyski

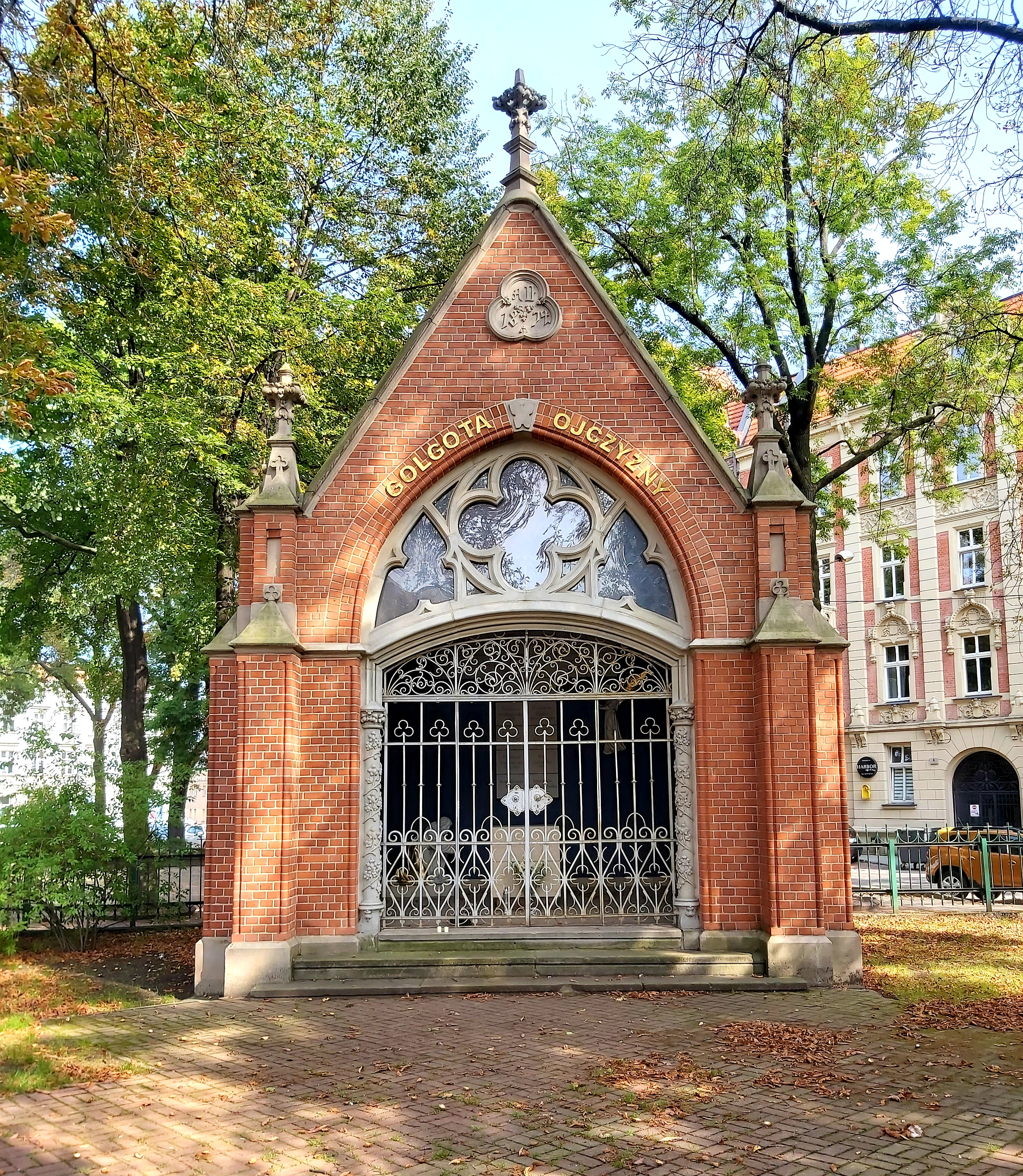
Chapel near the church (2021)
