= Helena Unierzyska =

Polish artist, sculptor (1867–1932)

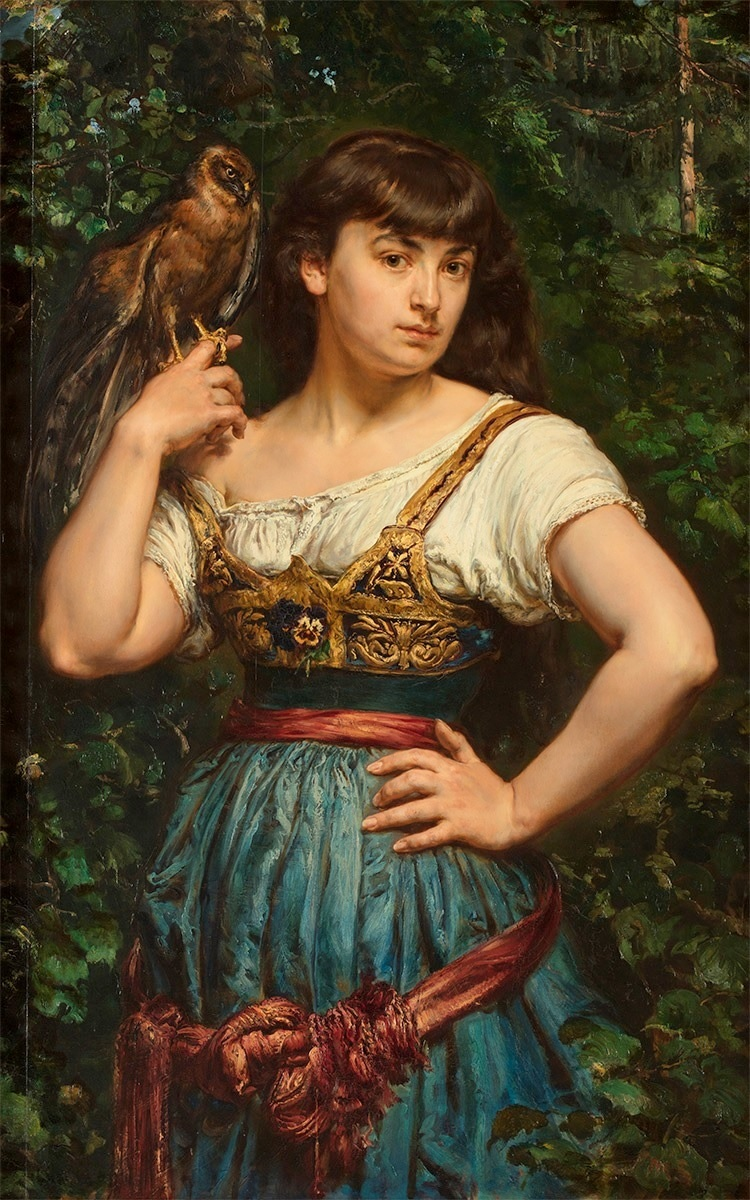
Helena Matejko by Jan Matejko, circa 1883

Helena Unierzyska née Matejko (6 April 1867 – 11 October 1932), was a Polish painter and sculptor, daughter of Poland's national painter Jan Matejko and his wife Teodora Giebułtowska who often posed for his paintings. She is best remembered as the live model for a series of her father's symbolic portraits of girls, and less as an aspiring artist.

== Biography ==
During her infancy, Helena lived with her parents in Krzesławice, a suburb of Kraków. She often assisted her father in his painting trips and daily studio sessions. On 24 June 1891, she married one of her father's students from the Academy of Fine Arts, painter Józef Unierzyski. Notably, her own mother disapproved of the match and did not attend the wedding ceremony.

After the wedding, Helena and her husband went to live in Boleń, a village near Kraków. They had no children of their own, but adopted children from the village.

Helena helped Polish victims in World War I and was awarded the Cross of Independence by Stanisław Wojciechowski in the interwar period.
