= Franciszek Ksawery Matejko =

Czech musician

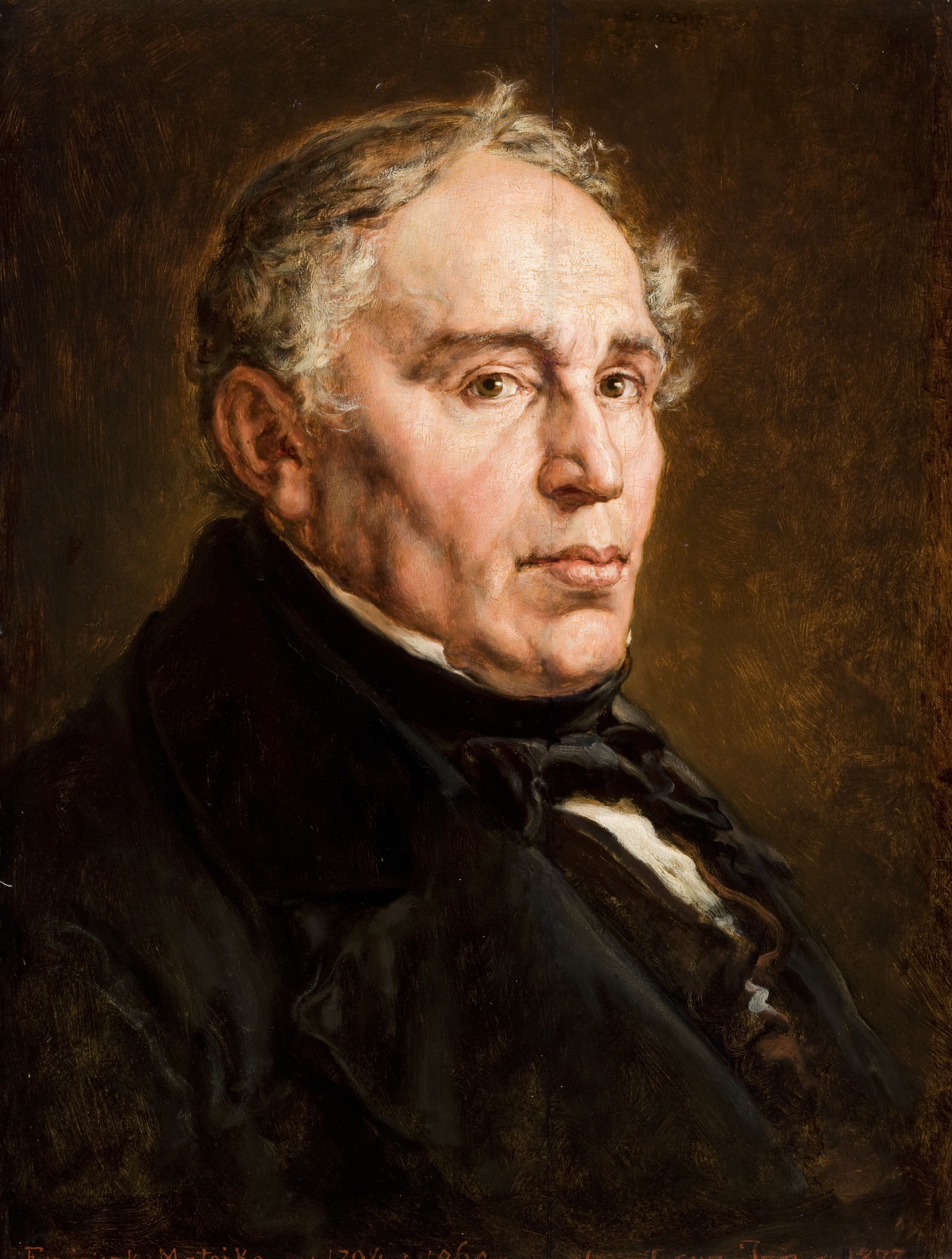

Background information
- Died: October 26, 1860 (aged 66–67) Krakow, Poland
- Spouse: Joanna Karolina Rossberg

Franciszek Ksawery Matejko (Czech: František Xaver Matějka) (1789 or 13 January 1793 in Roudnice – 26 October 1860 in Kraków) was a Czech musician, father of Polish painter Jan Matejko.

He was probably the son of farmer Josef Matějka and peasant woman Magdalena Knava from Roudnice, then in Kingdom of Bohemia, Habsburg monarchy, but other sources gave him other parents: organist František Josef Matějka and Mariana Dolanská.

After his mother's death he lived in Olomouc with his uncle canon Urbánek. He learned music in Hradec Králové. After that he went to Poland and became a music teacher.

On 22 November 1826 he married Joanna Karolina Rossberg, daughter of nobleman Jan Piotr Rossberg and his wife Anna Marianna Tusz.

Franciszek and his wife had eleven children:

- Franciszek Edward
- Edmund Marcin
- Zygmunt Hilary
- Emilia Łucja
- Alojzy (Adolf) Franciszek
- Józef Eustachy
- Karol Franciszek
- Maria Waleria
- Jan Alojzy
- Kazimierz Wilhelm
- Bolesław Wilhelm.

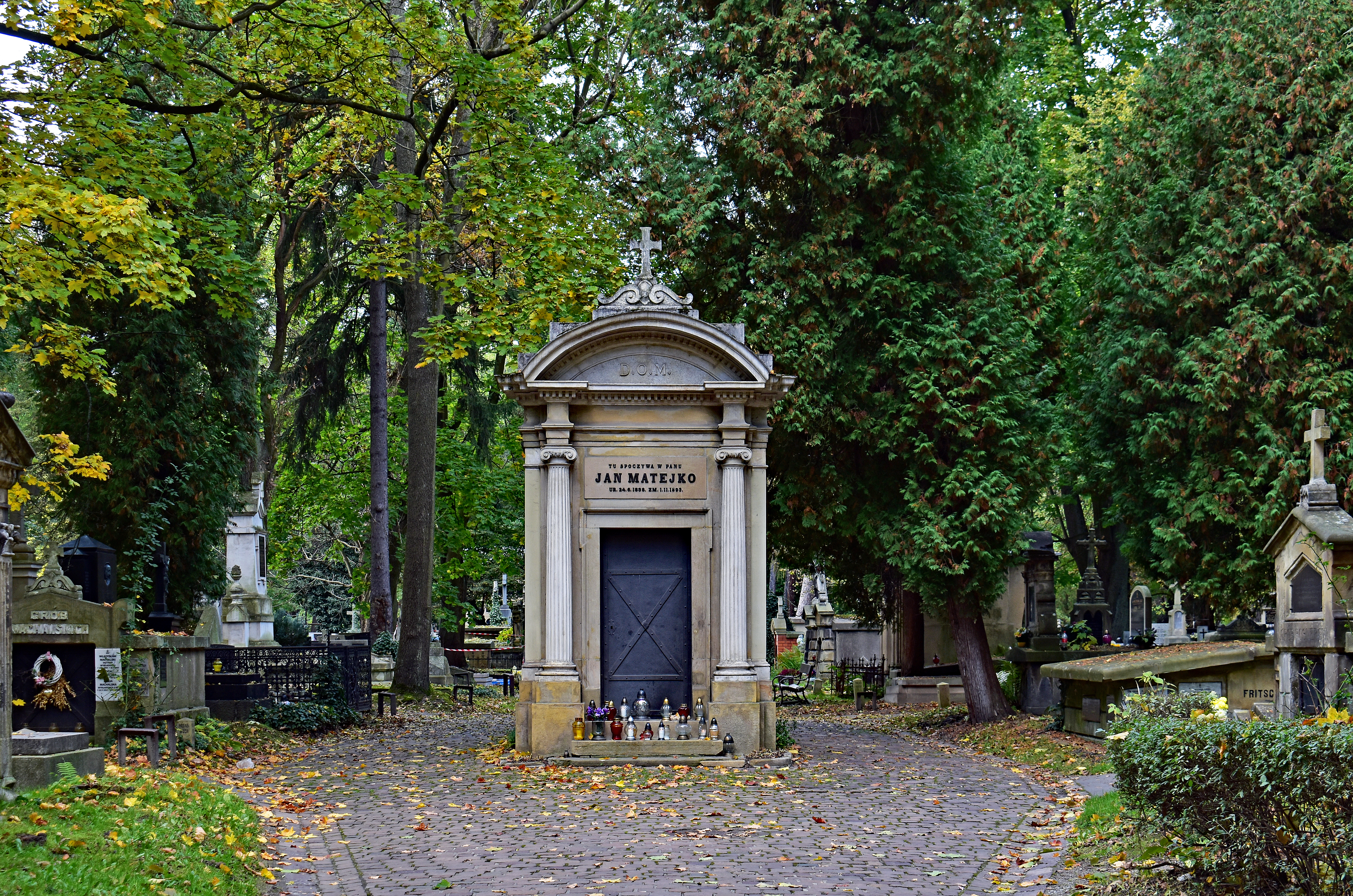
Kraków, Rakowicki Cemetery, the Matejko family tomb.

== Sources ==
- Maria Szypowska Jan Matejko wszystkim znany, Dom Słowa Polskiego, Warszawa 1988
