= Teodora Matejko =

Wife of Jan Matejko (1846–1896)

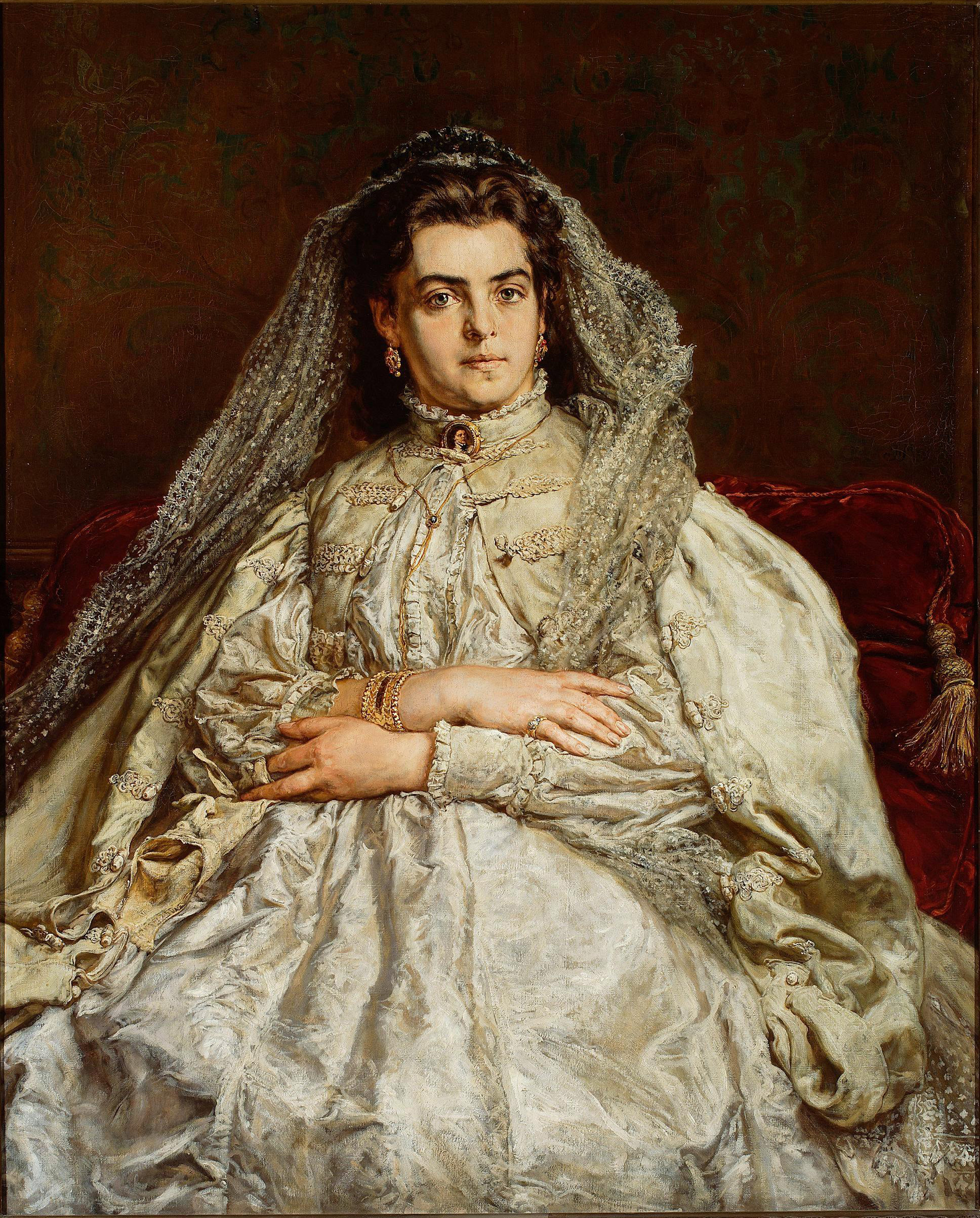
Teodora Matejko in wedding dress, painting by Jan Matejko

Teodora Matejko (Matejkowa) née Giebułtowska (1846 – 25 August 1896), Is primarily known for serving as a live model for Poland's' national painter Jan Matejko, her husband. For many years, Teodora served as the live model for her husband's portrayals of notable women from Polish history.

== Life ==
Her parents were Antoni Giebułtowski and Paulina Sikorska. Matjeko was a member of the Giebułtowski family of retailers from Nowy Wiśnicz, friends of the family of her future husband. On 21 November 1864 she married painter Jan Matejko, future Rector of the Fine Arts Academy, whom she knew already from childhood. After the wedding, they settled in downtown Kraków, where she gave birth to five children: Tadeusz, Helena, Beata, Jerzy and Regina (died in infancy).

Soon after the move, Matejkowa was diagnosed with diabetes. in her later years she was also diagnosed with mental illness, for which she was briefly hospitalized twice.

== Sources ==
- Ciciora–Czwórnóg B., Jan Matejko, Kolekcja Muzeum Narodowego w Krakowie, Olszanica 2005, ISBN 83-89747-16-2, ss. 5–8.
- Serafińska S., Jan Matejko. Wspomnienia rodzinne, Wydawnictwo Literackie, Kraków 1958.
- Szypowska M., Jan Matejko wszystkim znany, Zarząd Krajowy Związku Młodzieży Wiejskiej, ISBN 83-00-02435-2, Warszawa 1988.
