= Laski (surname) =

Laski or Łaski (Polish feminine: Łaska, plural: Łascy) is a surname. Notable people with the surname include:

- Albert Łaski (died 1604), Polish alchemist
- Jan Łaski (1456–1531), Polish chancellor and archbishop
- Harold Laski (1893–1950), English political theorist, economist, author, and lecturer
- Hieronymus Jaroslaw Łaski (1496–1542), Polish palatine and diplomat, a nephew of Archbishop Łaski
- Jan Łaski (1499–1560), Polish Protestant evangelical reformer, a nephew of Archbishop Łaski
- Kazimierz Laski (1921–2015), Polish-Austrian economist
- Neville Laski (1890–1969), English judge and leader of Anglo-Jewry.
- Marghanita Laski (1915–1988), English journalist, radio panellist and novelist
- Michael Laski (born c. 1942), founder of the Communist Party USA (Marxist-Leninist)
