= Łask =

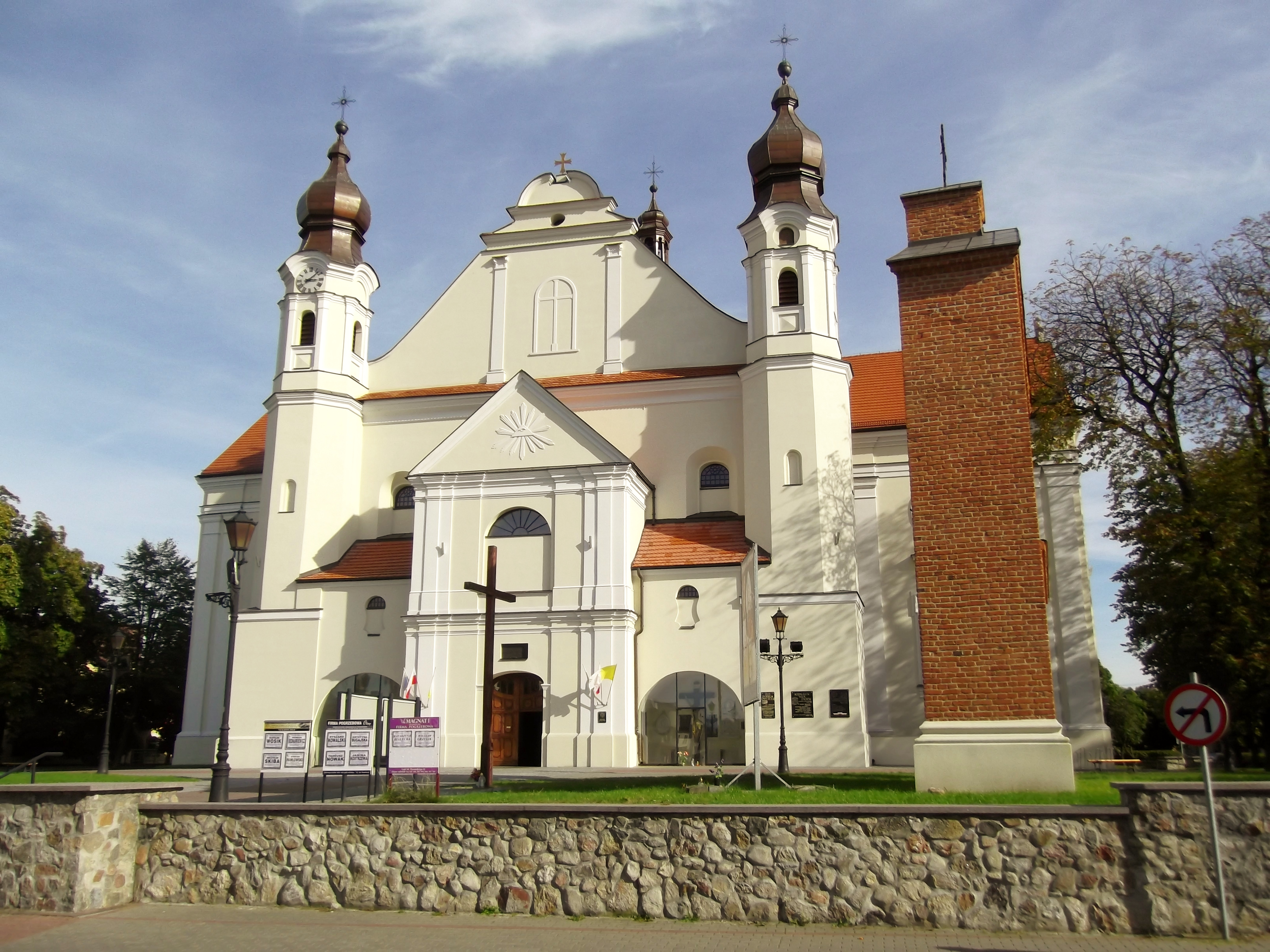
- Collegiate Church of the Immaculate Conception of the Blessed Virgin Mary and Archangel Michael

- Coat of arms

- Location within Poland
- Coordinates: 51°35′25″N 19°8′0″E
- Country: Poland
- Voivodeship: Łódź
- County: Łask
- Gmina: Łask
- Established: 11th century
- First mentioned: 1356
- Town rights: 1422

Government
  - Mayor: Gabriel Szkudlarek

Area
  - Total: 15.33 km^{2} (5.92 sq mi)

Population (31 December 2020)
  - Total: 16,925 ▼
  - Density: 1,104/km^{2} (2,859/sq mi)
- Time zone: UTC+1 (CET)
  - Summer (DST): UTC+2 (CEST)
- Postal code: 98-100
- Vehicle registration: ELA
- Primary airport: Łódź Władysław Reymont Airport
- Website: www.lask.pl

Łask ([wask]) is a town in central Poland with 16,925 inhabitants (2020). It is the capital of Łask County, and is situated in Łódź Voivodeship. It is located in the Sieradz Land.

A town with some 1,000 years of history, Łask is a former residential town of the Łaski noble family under whose patronage it was developed into a notable regional center of trade and crafts. It contains heritage Gothic and Baroque churches and a local historical museum. It is located near the Route of the Heroes of the Battle of Warsaw 1920, the main highway connecting Wrocław with Łódź, Warsaw and Białystok. The Polish Air Force's 32nd Air Base is located nearby.

== History ==
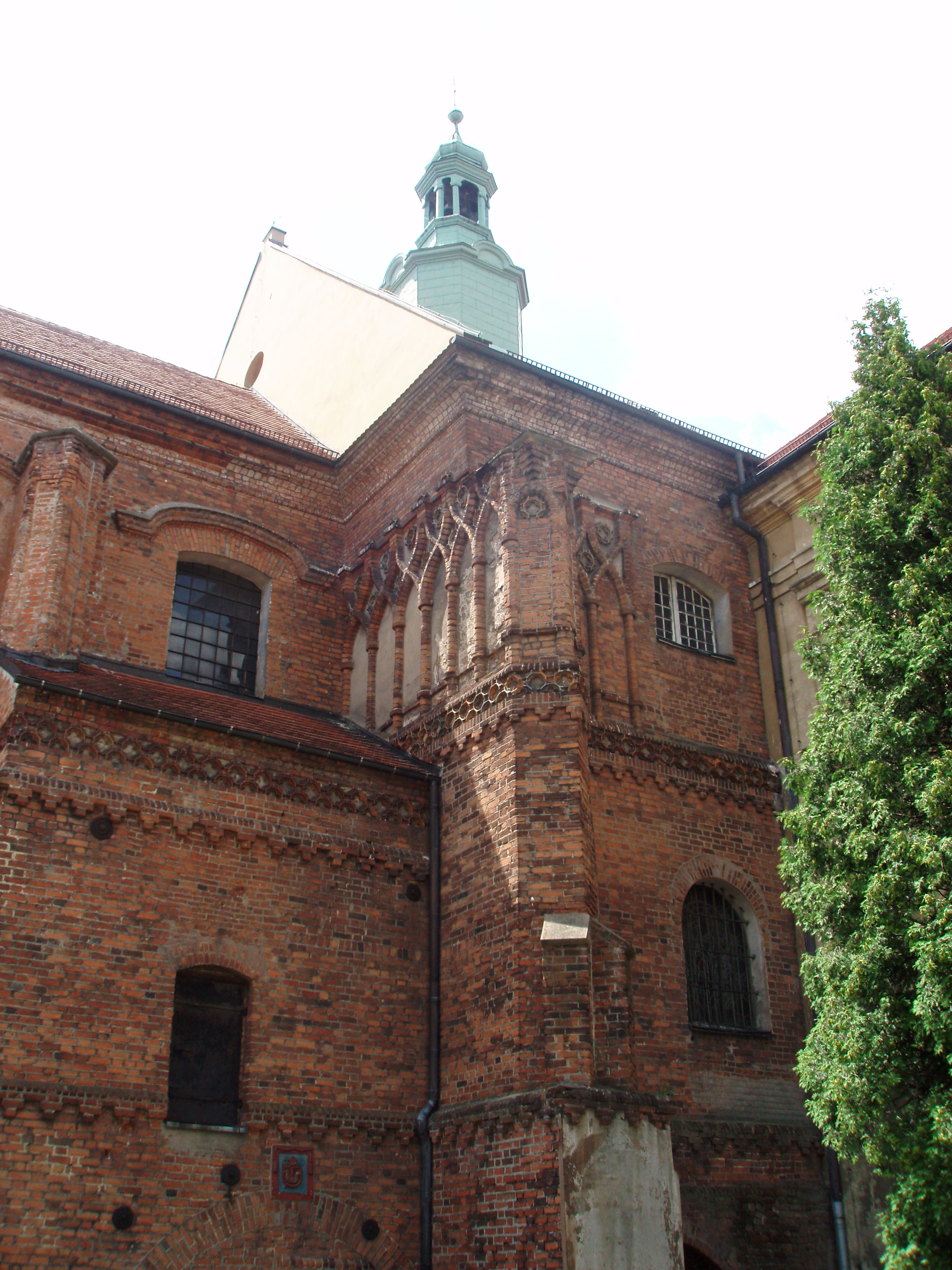
Gothic part of the Collegiate Church

Łask was founded in the 11th century, and from the 14th century it was the seat of the powerful Łaski noble family. Korab, the family's coat of arms, remains the town's coat of arms to this day. The first mention of Łask comes from 1356. A church was built in 1366, and in 1498 Polish prince and Primate of Poland Frederick Jagiellon founded a hospital for the poor. In 1422 it was granted town rights modeled on Środa Śląska by virtue of a document issued by Polish king Władysław II Jagiełło in Mielno. The king also set up an annual fair and a weekly market. In 1504, King Alexander Jagiellon confirmed and extended the privileges. Crafts soon developed and in 1517–1523, the town's landmark Gothic collegiate church was erected under the patronage of the Primate of Poland Jan Łaski. It was partially rebuilt in Baroque style in the 18th century. Thanks to the efforts of Hieronymus Łaski, King Sigismund III Vasa granted four new fairs in 1613. After the Łaski family, from 1660 until the Partitions of Poland the town was owned by the Nadolski, Wierzbowski and Załuski families. Łask was a private town, administratively located in the Szadek County in the Sieradz Voivodeship in the Greater Poland Province of the Kingdom of Poland.

Jews began to settle in the town at the close of the 16th century. From that time forward, the Jewish population of the town averaged between 50% and 65% of the total, typical of small shtetls of the region. The primary industries were leather tanning, textiles, and food. The surnames Łaski (Laski) and Lasker derive from the name of the town, many of those with the former surname are of Polish descent, while often those with the latter are of Jewish descent.

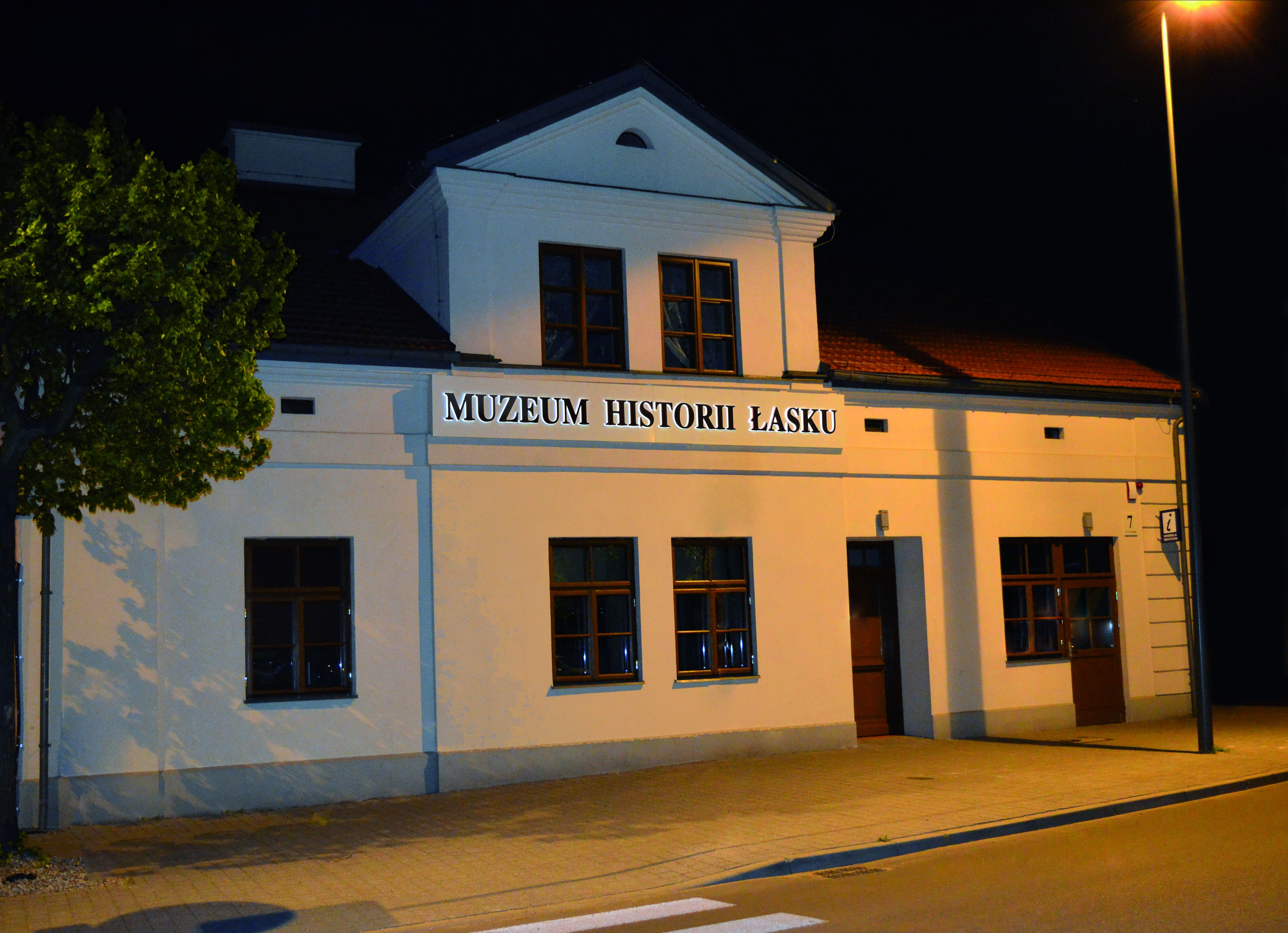
Historical Museum located in an old house

In 1793 Łask was annexed by the Kingdom of Prussia in the Second Partition of Poland, in 1807 it became part of the short-lived Polish Duchy of Warsaw, and in 1815 it was designated as part of Congress Poland, later forcibly incorporated into Russia. The Polish population took part in 19th-century Polish uprisings and patriotic manifestations. At the same time, Łask saw an influx of Jewish people fleeing persecution in Russia (see Pale of Settlement).

In 1903 the town was connected to the railway line and industrial plants were built. During World War I, the town was occupied by Germany, and after the war, in 1918 it was re-integrated with Poland, as Poland regained independence. In 1919, Łask became a county seat within the Łódź Voivodeship. By 1939, "there were 3,864 Jews out of a total population of 6,000 people living in the town."

=== World War II ===
With the invasion of Poland and the outbreak of the Second World War in September 1939, Łask was occupied by the Wehrmacht and annexed by Nazi Germany. The town was then administered as part of the county or district (kreis) of Lask within the newly formed province Reichsgau Wartheland, and the Jewish half of the population and the Polish intelligentsia were systematically targeted and annihilated under the racial policy of Nazi Germany. Some Poles from Łask were among the victims of large massacres of Poles committed by Nazi Germany in nearby Łagiewniki (present-day district of Łódź) in December 1939 during the Intelligenzaktion.

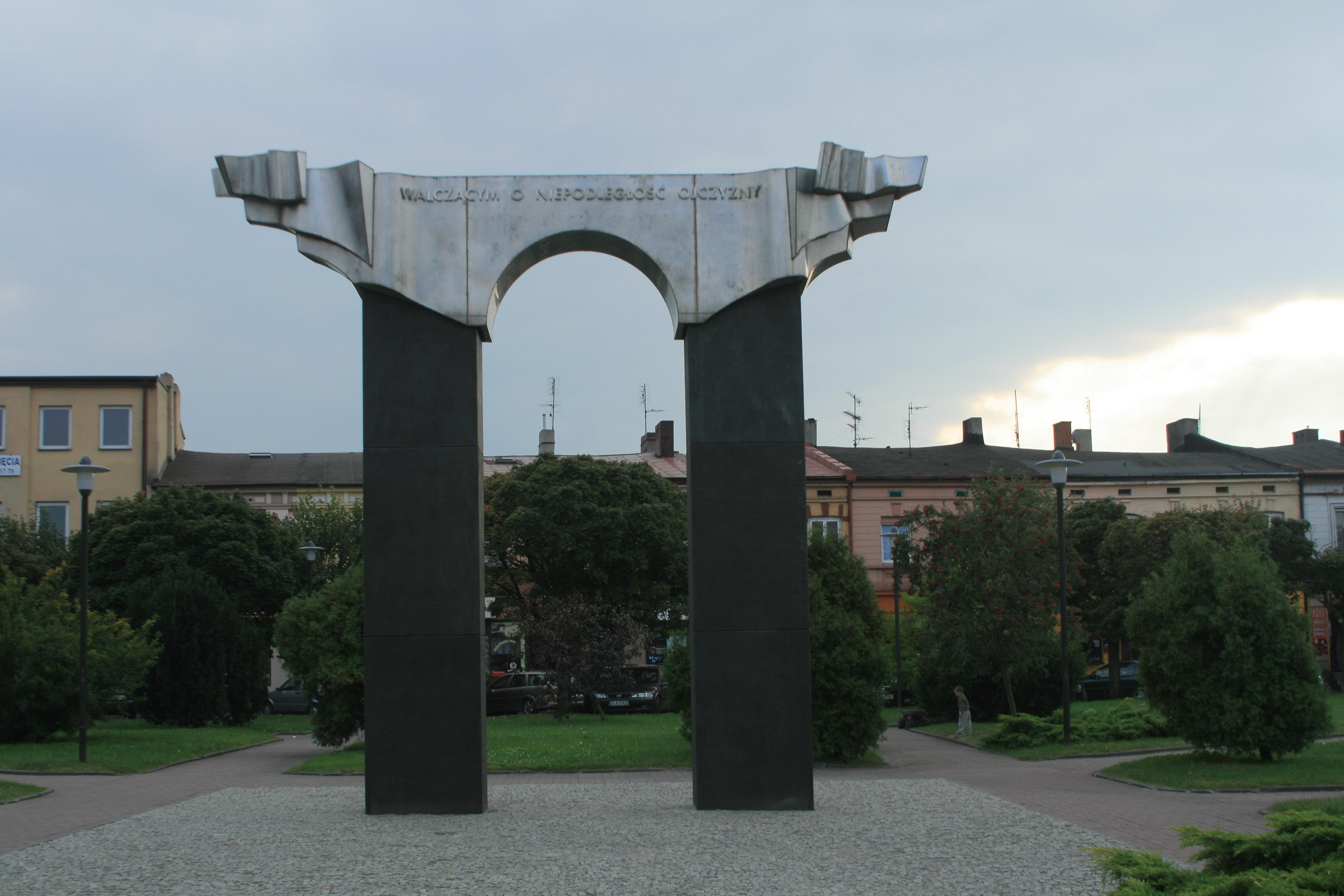
A monument to those who fought for Poland's independence

In January 1940, it was reported by the Jewish Telegraphic Agency that 100 Jewish citizens of Łask had been summarily executed en masse without trial because house-to-house searches by the Nazis revealed that they were armed and were planning to resist. The town's synagogue was then surrounded by the Nazis and "hundreds more" Jews were shot and killed as they tried to defend the building. With their deaths, the Nazis put the structure to the torch and it was consumed in fire. By December 1940, 3,467 Jews from the town who had survived these mass murders were confined to a ghetto.

In 1941, hundreds of other Jews were brought to the area from surrounding regions. At the same time, the Germans destroyed the old Jewish cemetery in the town, and paved the sidewalks of the town with its gravestones. A year later, on August 24, 1942, a "liquidation" of the ghetto was carried out. Those who were infirm or ill were murdered outright, and all the other Jews were taken to a church outside the town. There they were examined, and 760 selected Jews were transferred to the Łódź Ghetto, some of the ill were killed on the spot, and the remainder of the 3,500 Jews were transported to the Chełmno extermination camp, where they were killed. Later, the Germans hunted down the remnant Jews hiding in the town and killed them all. A wall plaque in Łask commemorates "the 3,517 Lasker Jews exterminated by the Nazis during August, 1942." Only about 20 Lask Jews survived the war, one hidden by a Christian farmer.

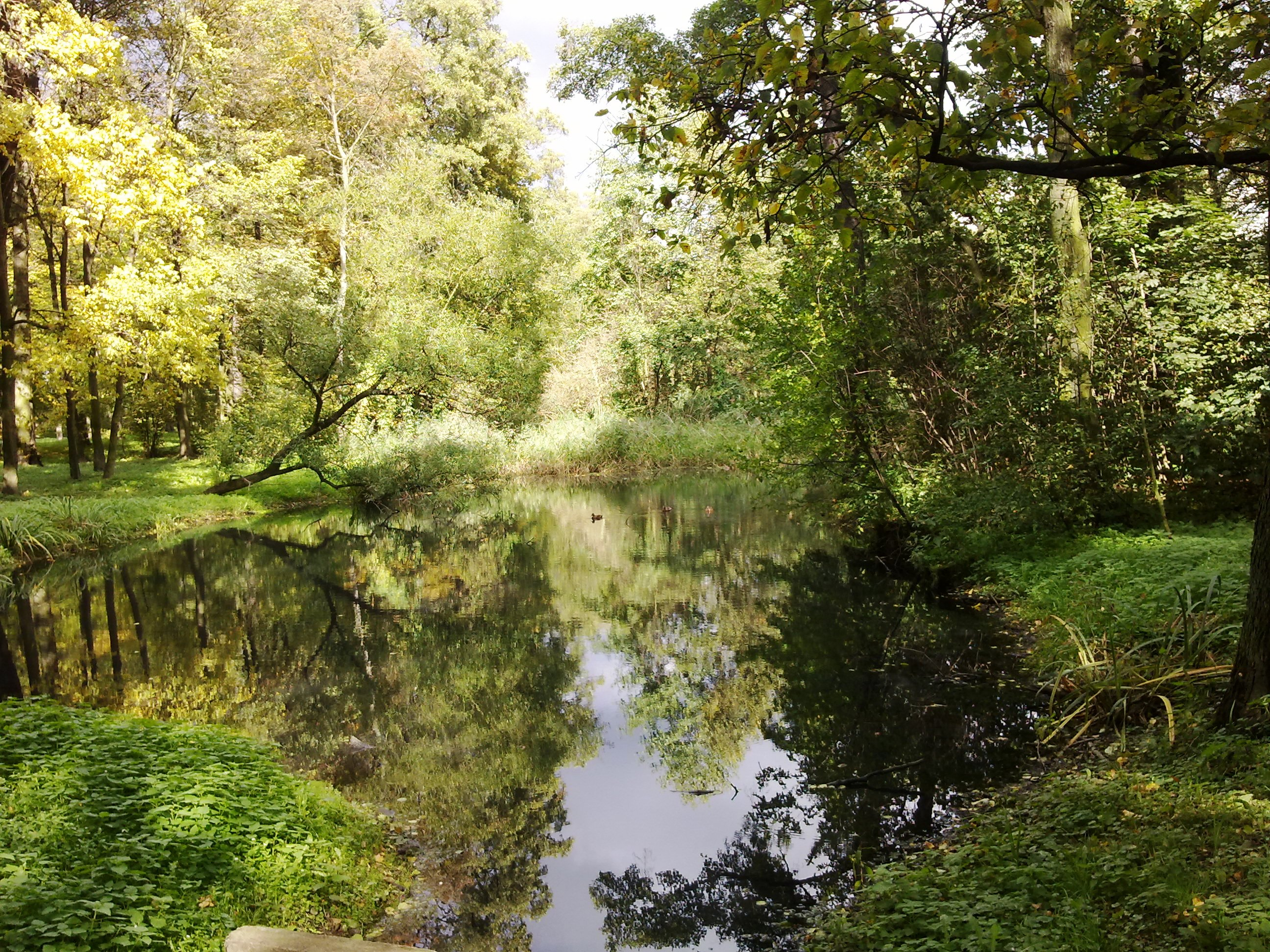
Łaski Manor Park

Following the arrival of the Red Army and the subsequent end of the war in 1945, Łask became part of the People's Republic of Poland. As of 2004, "Łask has 18,948 inhabitants [...] and there are no known Jewish inhabitants."

=== Recent times ===
It was administratively located in the Sieradz Voivodeship from 1975 to 1998.

A detachment of the US Air Force has been permanently stationed at Łask Air Base since November 2012.

== Notable residents ==
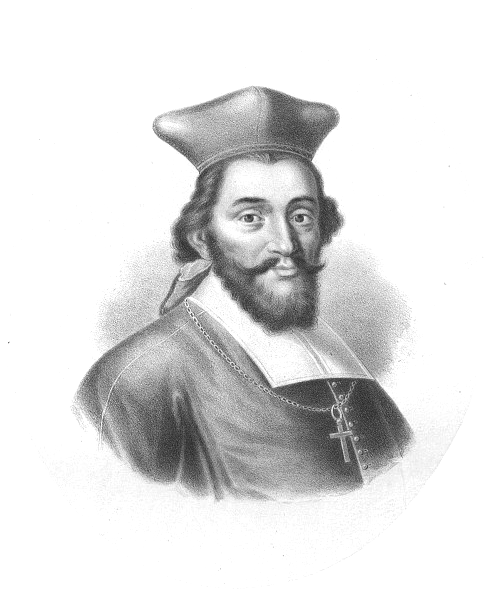
Jan Łaski, Primate of Poland

- Jan Łaski (1456–1531), Primate of Poland.
- Hieronymus Łaski (1496–1542), Polish diplomat.
- Jan Łaski (1499–1560), Protestant reformer.
- Olbracht Łaski (died 1604), Polish alchemist
- Aaron Karfunkel, 18th century rabbi
- Mieczysław Wolfke (1883–1947), Polish physicist
- Genowefa Kobielska (1906–1993) track and field athlete, competed in the 1928 Summer Olympics
- Magda Femme (born 1971), Polish pop singer
- Ilona Felicjańska (born 1973), Miss Polonia 1993
- Dr Luke (born 1973), Pop music composer/producer
- Artur Golański (born 1992) a Polish footballer
- Malwina Smarzek (born 1996), volleyball player, competed in the 2024 Summer Olympics

== Twin towns ==
Łask is twinned with:

- Dannenberg, Germany
- Lahoysk, Belarus
