= Korab coat of arms =

Polish coat of arms

Korab
- Battle cry: Korab
- Alternative names: Korabczik, Korabiów
- Earliest mention: 1242
- Cities: Łask, Staszów
- Divisions: Staszów County
- Families: 283 names Adamczewski, Andrykiewicz, Andryszkiewicz, Bąkowski, Berner, Białuch, Bieniedzki, Bierbasz, Bobkowski, Bogusławski, Boguszowski, Boiński, Bojanowski, Bojemski, Bojeruski, Bolembski, Bolemski, Boleński, Bołońdź, Bońkowski, Borzkowski, Bronowski, Brzozowski, Bugielski, Chaciszewski, Chajewski, Chajęcki, Chasiecki, Chiżanowski, Chlewski, Chociszowski, Chojecki, Chrościelski, Chruśliński, Chrzanowski, Chwalibowski, Chyżanowski, Cymerman, Czacharowski, Czachorowski, Czachowski, Czachórski, Czachurski, Czajkowski, Czarnołoski, Czarnołuski, Czartkowski, Czechelski, Czepiel, Czepielski, Czepik, Czerniecki, Dąbrowski, Dobkint, Dolański, Domasowski, Domaszowski, Dowkint, Drogoszewski, Drozdowski, Dubalski, Dulibiński, Dymitrowski, Dyski, Dziadkowski, Dziatkowski, Dziekoński, Ejsmont, Eysmont, Eysymont, Eysymontt, Falibowski, Faliński, Figura, Fischel, Fiszel, Gałęski, Gądkowski, Gątkowski, Gerłowski, Gerżabek, Gierłowski, Gilicki, Gliniecki, Głoskowski, Gniazdowski, Godziątkowski, Gogoliński, Goraj, Gorzycki, Grabanowski, Grędzica, Grodzielski, Grudzielski, Grzędzica, Grzywowski, Guńkowski, Głuszczewski, Haczkowski, Hajewski, Hardziewicz, Hliniecki, Hołowicki, Horaj, Hordziejowski, Hordziewicz, Hordziewski, Hotowicki, Hotowski, Hrakał(ł)o-Horawski, Jankowski, Kałowski, Karnowicz, Karpicki, Karpiński, Karpowicz, Karski, Katorowski, Kiend, Kłodawski, Kobierzycki, Kociałkowski, Kociełkowski, Kociołkowski, Kokoski, Kokowski, Kolbuszewski, Kolbuszowski, Kołdowski, Korabiewicz, Korabiewski, Korabiowski, Koropowicz, Kosieradzki, Kosk, Kościełkowski, Kotarowski, Kotowicki, Kotowiecki, Kowalski, Krampiewski, Krąpiewski, Krokocki, Krompiewski, Krompniewski, Krowicki, Krynicki, Kryński, Krzętkowski, Krzyaszowski, Kucharski, Kwiatkowski, Ladszaft, Laskowicz, Laskowski, Ligenza, Ligęza, Lobeski, Loża, Lubeski, Luteński, Lutomski, Lutyński, Łabanow, Łabanowski, Łabęcki, Łabudziński, Łaski, Łazowicki, Łazowiecki, Łobeski, Łobod, Łoboda, Łopatecki, Łoza, Łoża, Łódź, Maciejczak, Majkowski, Małaszewicz, Małkowski, Manecki, Marski, Mestwiłł, Mielaczewski, Miełaczewski, Mikołajewicz, Milczewski, Miłaczewski, Miłaczowski, Miłaszewicz, Młodziejowski, Molski, Morawski, Murawski, Nacesławski, Naciesławski, Nacisławski, Naczesławski, Nadsławski, Nawojski, Nawoyski, Nayniewicz, Oleszkiewicz, Oleszkowicz, Orzeszko, Orzeszkowski, Ososki, Ostrawski, Ostrowski, Pacynowski, Paczynowski, Pajęcki, Parachamowicz, Paradowski, Parchamowicz, Penza, Perzyński, Pęczykowski, Piątkowski, Pieczanowski, Piecznowski, Pieńczykowski, Pieruski, Pierzyński, Pięczniewski, Pięcznowski, Piotraszko, Piotruszewski, Pirecki, Ponikwicki, Poradowski, Poradowski Kopik na Poradowie, Powidzki, Przeczeń, Przeniewski, Radlica, Radlicki, Rajmir, Rajski, Rakielewicz, Rayski, Rolikowski, Rosowski, Rulikowski, Rusocki, Russocki, Sabra, Saleniewicz, Sczurski, Sęczkowski, Skarczewski, Skulski, Słonecki, Sobociński, Sobocki, Sokołowski, Sołomko, Sopociński, Stodolnicki, Szczurowicki, Szczurski, Śliwnicki, Świecicki, Taniczewski, Taniszewski, Tarusz, Trąbski, Wąglewski, Wdziekoński, Wiązkowicz, Widmont, Wietrykowski, Wietrzykowski, Wojciechowski, Wojsanowski, Wojsławski, Wolanowski, Woyciechowski, Woyszycki, Zadzik, Zbikowski, Zdzenicki, Zdzeński, Zdzienic, Zdzienicki, Zdziański, Zdzieński, Zdziński, Zimmermann, Żbikowski, Żeromski

Korab is a Polish coat of arms. It was used by many szlachta (noble) families under the Kingdom of Poland and the Polish–Lithuanian Commonwealth.

== History ==
- Motto of the Korab coat of arms: "Deo Gloria" ("Glory to God").
- First Mention: 1242 Zbislaw of Korab appointed Voivode of Sieradz.
- Second Registry: 1292 from the Seal of Korab.
- Third Registry: 1480s - Revised. "The golden Watchtower within the Ark of Noah was removed from the Seal of Korab and replaced with a Black Mast.

In 1983 the Polish Korab coat of arms was unusually incorporated into a grant of arms by the English College of Arms in London. These new arms included the Ciołek Arms held by the Zelenski (Zileinski) clan which were used as the crest of the Armorial Bearings with the shield of the Korab remaining the same. The two families were united by marriage in 1977. This was an unusual grant of arms and said to have made heraldic history in England.

== Notable bearers ==
Notable bearers of this coat of arms have included:

- Zbislaw of Sieradz
- Janisław I, Archbishop of Gniezno
- Jan Łaski (1456–1531), Primate of Poland
- Hieronymus Łaski
- Jakub Zadzik
- Wojciech Chrzanowski (1793–1861), polish general
- Ludomił Rayski
- Jacques Hnizdovsky (1915–1985) — Ukrainian-American painter, printmaker, graphic designer, illustrator and sculptor
- Mikołaj Łabęcki (1830–1908), polish judge
- Hanna Helena Chrzanowska (1902 – 1973), blessed Polish Roman Catholic nurse and Benedictine oblate.

== See also ==
- Polish heraldry
- Heraldic family
- List of Polish nobility coats of arms

== Bibliography ==
- Bartosz Paprocki: Herby rycerstwa polskiego na pięcioro ksiąg rozdzielone, Kraków, 1584.
- Tadeusz Gajl: Herbarz polski od średniowiecza do XX wieku : ponad 4500 herbów szlacheckich 37 tysięcy nazwisk 55 tysięcy rodów. L&L, 2007. ISBN 978-83-60597-10-1.
