= Golański =

Golański (feminine: Golańska; plural: Golańscy) is a surname. Notable people with the name include:

- Artur Golański (born 1992), Polish footballer
- Henryk Golański (1908–1995), Polish diplomat and politician
- Paweł Golański (born 1982), Polish footballer
