= Izaak of Spain =

Jewish court physician

Izaak (Izaczko) of Spain or Izaak ben Abraham (Polish: Izaak z Hiszpanii; died 1509/1510 in Kraków) was a Jewish court physician to the Sultan of Aq Qoyunlu Uzun Hasan and later to four Polish kings of Jagiellonian dynasty. He was also called Doctor Spaniard (Polish: Doktor Hiszpan) or in Latin Hispanus Hebraeus.

The date of Izaak's birth is not known, but he was certainly born in Jerusalem as the son of Abraham. He then found himself at the court of the Sultan Uzun Hasan, where he served as court physician. In 1472, the Sultan sent him on a diplomatic mission to Europe. Izaak visited the courts of Moldavian hospodar Stephen the Great, King of Hungary Matthias Corvinus and King of Poland Casimir IV Jagiellon. He then settled in Poland, although it is not known exactly in what year. By 1492 he was court physician to Casimir IV Jagiellon. In 1496-1497 he stayed in Lviv, where he treated the archbishop of Lviv, Andrzej Róża Boryszewski.

After the death of Casimir IV, he remained at the court as physician to his sons one by one ascending the throne: John I Albert (1492–1501), Alexander I Jagiellon (1501–1506) and Sigismund I the Old. For his service he received numerous privileges, already John I Albert excluded him and his family and household from the jurisdiction of royal officials and subjected them to his own jurisdiction, he also exempted him from taxes paid by other Jews. Alexander I granted him an annual salary of 12 Polish grzywnas per year, which he later raised to 100 florins, and granted him the right to live in Kazimierz near Kraków. After his death, Sigismund I granted his widow Berszewa the same privileges.

Izaak also performed diplomatic functions for Polish rulers. In 1501-1502 he carried out a diplomatic mission to the Khan of the Crimean Khanate. And in 1503–1504 to the khan of the Great Horde.
