= Clothes in Poland =

Book about Polish clothing

Clothes in Poland 1200-1795 (Ubiory w Polsce) is an album by Jan Matejko, first published in 1860. The album contains ten boards made in lithography technique, on which the author presented the appearance of Polish costumes across centuries and different social classes. Clothes in Poland have significant historical value and are one of the major publications on the history of Polish clothing.

== Description of the work ==
On the title page, Matejko drew a Gothic triptych with Our Lady of Częstochowa and bishops - St. Adalbert and St. Stanisław. The triptych is supported by an angel with shields and it contains images of:

- Piast Eagle
- Lithuania's pursuit
- Lion – the sign of Wenceslaus, the Czech and Polish king

Below them, there is a Cracow's coat of arms from the 14th century and the date 1860.

On the sides, there are figures representing various states, dressed in medieval costumes. Each of them was placed in a separate arcade referring to the Romanesque style. In the arcades, below the figures, there are two drawings of the oldest Polish seals, depicting Queen Richeza and Henry the Bearded. On the reversed side of the title page, Matejko placed an arrangement of 9 groups of figures for all boards. The table layout, from the top:

- on the left side, most of them contain scholars, clergy, peasants, and sometimes Jews;
- centrally: nobility, king and court, townspeople;
- on the right: knights, magnates, guilds and brotherhoods.

Only on the first panel, instead of peasants, the artist draws townspeople, and instead of a group of townspeople, the artist placed the seal of King Wenceslaus of Bohemia. On the central panel depicting the king and the court, the artist placed the dates of their reign, coats of arms, and seals.

== History ==
The first edition of Clothes in Poland was published in 1860. It was made using the lithography technique in the Czas printing studio in Cracow. The dimensions of the first and second editions are 57.4 × 85.5 cm. The title page of the second edition from 1875 has the inscription: "Published by Jan Matejko. Printed in lithography. M Salba. Second edition, 1875 - ownership reserved".

In 1879, Matejko published Explanations of Ten Tables of Clothes in Poland, an album gathering information about the works of art and places the artist referenced and used when drawing coats of arms and figures for individual groups. However, Matejko does not provide the names of the authors of foreign works or publications. There are several mistakes in the Explanations. For example, on the third panel, the figure of the king, which is a drawing from a sculpture by Veit Stoss, represents Kazimierz Jagiellończyk, and not Władysław Jagiełło, as Matejko said. The figure of Albrecht Łaski from Table V of the Magnates group was, according to the artist, drawn based on a medal and a woodcut. However, Łaski's medal has no resemblance to the figure in Clothes in Poland.

The third edition was published in Warsaw in 1901, after the death of Jan Matejko. Dimensions have changed (21 × 29 cm), as well as the title: Clothes in Old Poland. In this edition, each group was placed on a separate card, according to the order in the Explanations.

The fourth edition of Clothes in Poland was published in 1967 by Wydawnictwo Literackie in Kraków. For technical reasons, it has a similar size as the third edition from 1901. The ten plates and the vignette were based on the first edition, and the individual groups of plates were reproduced from color copies made by Roman Hennel according to the copy from the Jagiellonian Library, colored by Jan Matejko. Sketches and studies of figures, costumes, weapons, and coats of arms mostly come from the collections of the National Museum in Krakow, the Jan Matejko House.

Matejko developed Clothes in Poland based on materials collected from his youth. The artist's album and diary, called Skarbczyk, has expanded over the years with drawings on tracing paper, studies, and notes. During his studies, the artist was greatly impressed by the portfolios of researchers of the history of Polish culture and monuments: Ambroży Grabowski, Józef Łepkowski, and Józef Muczkowski. The files contained a variety of notes, watercolors, engravings, drawings, and reproductions, which were a great source of information from various fields of culture for him.

Matejko selected images of people in historical costumes based on thousands of copies and drawings collected in Skarbczyk, Among the others, there are sculptures by Veit Stoss from St. Mary's Church and Wawel Cathedral, portraits of bishops from the Franciscan church, portraits of kings, and images of professors of the Jagiellonian University, an 18th-century painting of the Dance of Death from the Bernardine church, The drawings and notes made during the trips, as well as the analysis of sculptures, paintings, medals, and seals, allowed Matejko to see many figures in authentic clothes and to collect extensive material on the costumes of courts, scholars, clergy, townspeople, nobility, and magnates. For costumes from earlier eras, some details were based on monuments, and groups of villagers were modeled on regional costumes. For Matejko, it was important not only to faithfully recreate the clothes but also to recreate the face in a modern way, which made him draw copies of the seal of Bolesław the Chaste several times. The artist was aware of the enormous amount of material that needed to be collected to develop an accurate Polish costume design history album and he was the first to publish a source work in this field. The lack of the author's signature on the title pages and tables proves that Matejko considered Clothes a compiled collection of costumes worn in Poland, and not an artistic work, while work on the publication became the basis of Matejko's work in the field of historical painting.

The group's drawings were transferred by Matejko onto tracing paper with lithographic ink and then impressed on the lithographic stone. Due to the inability to produce chromolithographic illustrations in Krakow, the graphics are single-colored. This required the artist to color the boards with watercolor in the first two copies of Clothes and the rest of it was given to young painters to color them for him. Colored copies were donated to the Jagiellonian Library and the Ossoliński Library in Lviv.

title page of the second edition of Clothes in Poland, 1875

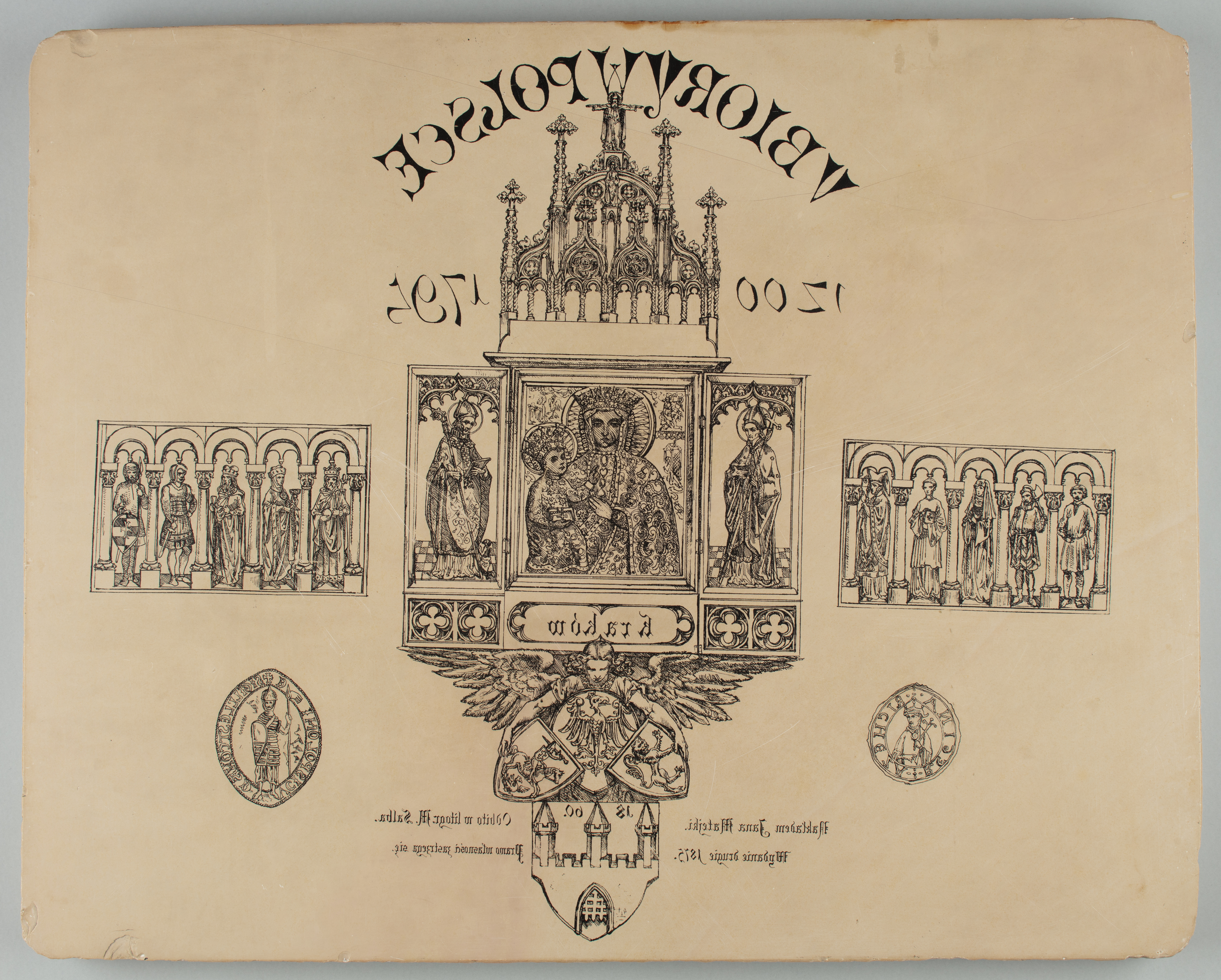
lithographic plate for the title page of the second edition of Clothes in Poland, 1875

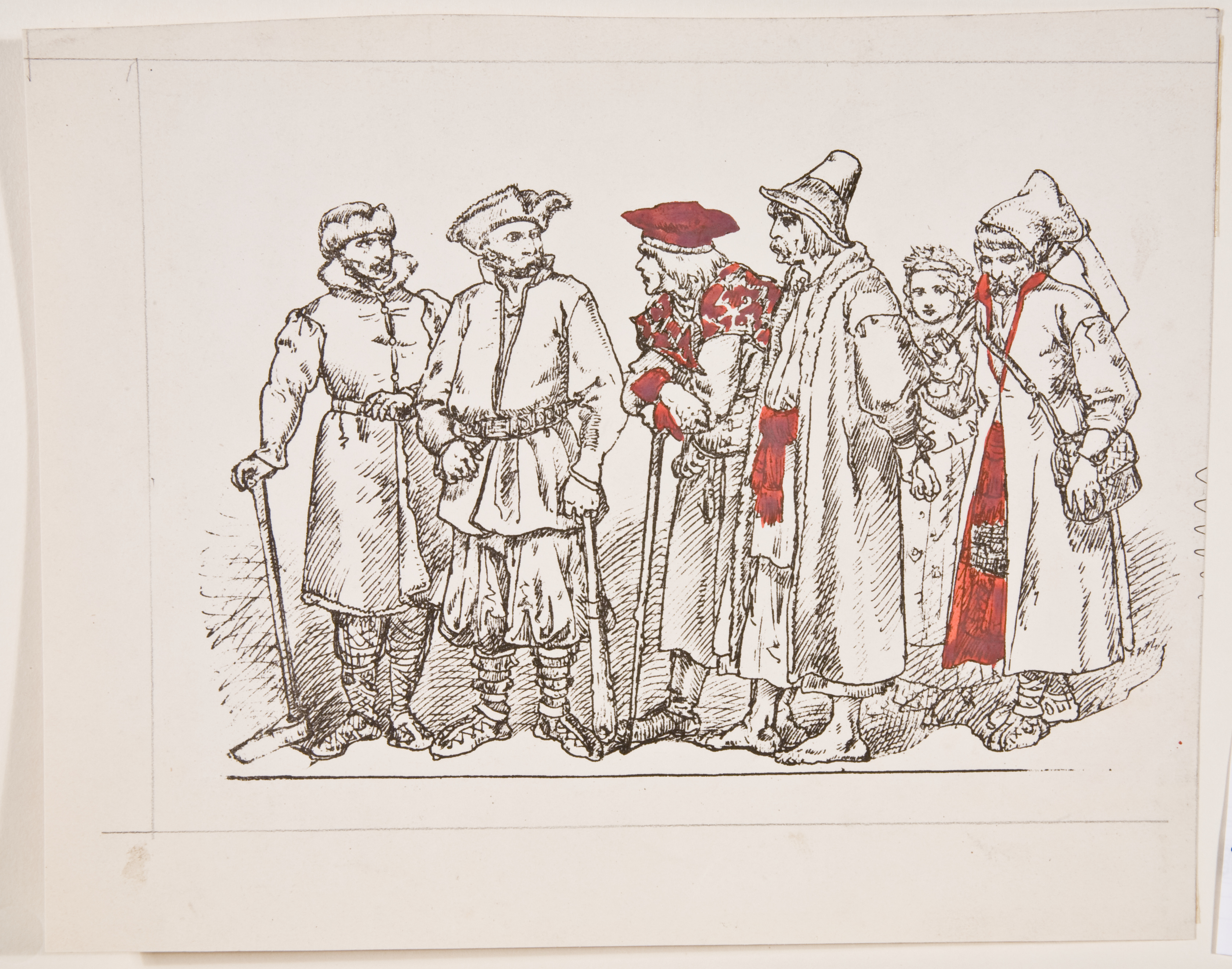
hand-colored card by Jan Matejko

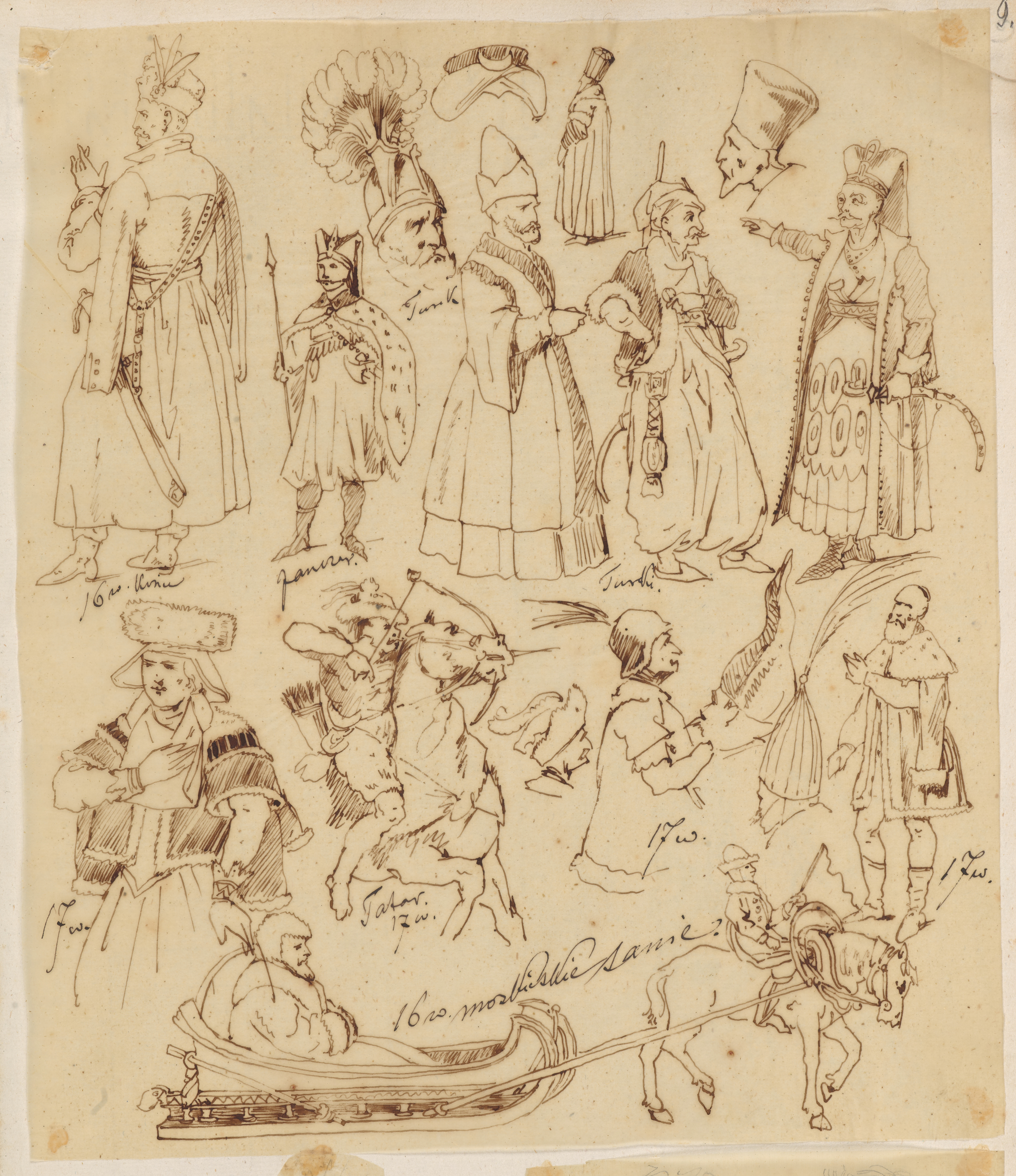
Skarbczyk. Sketches of standing figures, riders, sleighs, heads, clothes from the 16th and 17th centuries
