= Aaron Karfunkel =

Aaron Karfunkel (also known as Aaron ben Judah; in Hebrew, Aharon ben Yehudah ha-Kohen; in Yiddish, Aaron Löb (died 1816) was a Bohemian rabbi of the eighteenth and nineteenth centuries. After having successively filled the rabbinates of Gawartschew, Łask, Dasparschi, and Widowa, he was called in 1801 to Náchod, where he remained until 1806. From 1807 to 1816 he was chief rabbi of Silesia. Karfunkel was the author of She'eltot Abiyah, containing dissertations on Talmudic subjects, and divided into twelve parts, having for their respective titles the names of the precious stones in the high priest's breastplate. Of these parts only two have been published (Berlin, 1806). They are divided into "kelalim", subdivided into paragraphs, with glosses entitled Millu'at Eben and dissertations called Meshuah Milhamah. Karfunkel was the author also of Tzanif Tahor, a commentary on Ecclesiastes, a manuscript of which is in the British Museum.
