= Szeliga coat of arms =

Polish coat of arms

Szeliga
- Earliest mention: 1366, 1386
- Families: Bakszewicz, Białecki, Bieleński, Bieliński, Bodzanowski, Bodzanta, Bodzenta, Bonblewski, Borohowicz, Borstejko, Bossowski, Bostowski, Bożanta, Brukot, Bryski, Budzyński, Bukraba, Buławka, Cetowski, Chaliński, Charzewski, Charzyński, Chlistowski, Chryścinicz, Chrzczonowicz, Chwaliszewski, Cieszęcki, Czarnotulski, Czernicki, Czetowski, Czyżewicz, Dąbrowski, Długopolski, Dobiasz, Dobieszewski, Dobrochowski, Dobuszewski, Domentowicz, Dowojna (Dowojna-Krupski), Dowojno, Drygat, Dyppen, Dzierzbicki, Ewachewicz, Fargow, Farzyński, Frankowski, Garyantesiewicz, Garyantesowicz, Gerwałowski, Gerwatowski, Gierwatowski, Głupicki, Gorecki, Goregland, Gośniewski, Górecki, Górski, Grykolewski, Grzebiński, Haryantesowicz, Horehland, Hryhorowicz, Hulewicz, Jagiełka, Jordański, Kabieński, Kawski, Kimont, Kobelicki, Korecki, Kozierski, Krzakowski, Krzczonowicz, Kunsinowicz, Lancucki, Lasowski, Lassowski, Laszewski, Lebedowicz, Lebiedowicz, Lisikiewicz, Losowski, Lossowski, Lutomski, Łańcucki, Łaszewski, Łaszowski, Łączyński, Łosowski, Łossowski, Łukomski, Łyszkiewicz, Magier, Magiera, Magiero, Magierowski, Malewicz, Małaszewski, Marjański, Markowski, Maryański, Matkuszewski, Maximowicz, Merecki, Mierecki, Mierzejewski, Mirecki, Mirecki Magiera, Mirewicz, Mirowicki, Mirzejewski, Mirzejowski, Mochuczy, Mohuczy, Morawski, Morosz, Moroz, Mostkowski, Nazarewicz, Nazarkowski, Niemojewski, Nizelski, Nizielski, Nogawczyński, Nogawka, Ogorzelewski, Ogorzelowski, Ostrouch, Piatychorowicz, Piątkowski, Piotraszko, Pląchowski, Pluciński, Podsoński, Pomuski, Potocki, Promiński, Proskurenko, Prumieński, Prumiński, Przeczkowski, Przesiadłowski, Puszkin, Pusłowski, Ramieński, Ratocki, Ratołd, Rozdolski, Rytel, Rytelewski, Rytelski, Ryttel, Rzuchowski, Serwatowicz, Sieluziński, Skoruppa, Skorupski, Sławski, Smoczek, Smolikowski, Songin, Stanisławski, Stołyhwo, Storożenko, Stróżenko, Strusiński, Sufczyński, Suffczyński, Suszczyński, Sylwestrowicz, Szafrański, Szczerbski, Szeliga, Szeligowski, Szeliha, Szeliski, Szkarupa, Szołkowski, Szpadkowski, Szuszczyński, Szyjkiewicz, Świacki, Świestowski, Tomara, Trojanowski, Troszczyński, Trusiewicz, Trzebiński, Tumiański, Turalski, Turzenin, Wach, Wargowski, Wnorowski, Wojcsik, Wojski, Wójsik, Wysokieński, Wysokiński, Zabawski, Złocki, Zubrzycki, Żegliński, Żernicki, Żuławski, Żurman, Żychliński

Szeliga is a Polish coat of arms. It was used by several szlachta families in the times of the Polish–Lithuanian Commonwealth.

== History ==
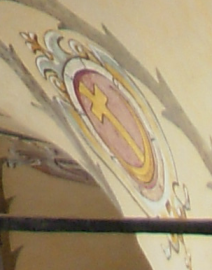
Szeliga coat of arms in Baranów Sandomierski castle

It is one of the oldest Polish coats of arms. First reported in a heraldic inventory dated 1464–1480 "Insignia seu clenodia Regis et Regni Poloniae" by Polish historian Jan Długosz, who noted it as a genuine Polish coat of arms. This medieval historian noted information about Szeliga as being among the oldest 71 Polish coats of arms saying: "Scheliga lunam defectuosam ceruleam, in cuius medio crux eminet, in campo rubeo defert Genus Polonicum in Yenerem pronunt".

== Blazon ==
In the sanguine field there is a golden crescent with a golden cross dominating it. In the crest a peacock's tail or feathers.

== Notable bearers ==
Notable bearers of this coat of arms include:

- Antoni Magier, university professor, physicist, meteorologist

== See also ==
- Polish heraldry
- Heraldry
- Coat of arms
- List of Polish nobility coats of arms
