= Jan Łaski =

Polish Calvinist reformer (1499–1560)

John à Lasco
- Jan Łaski
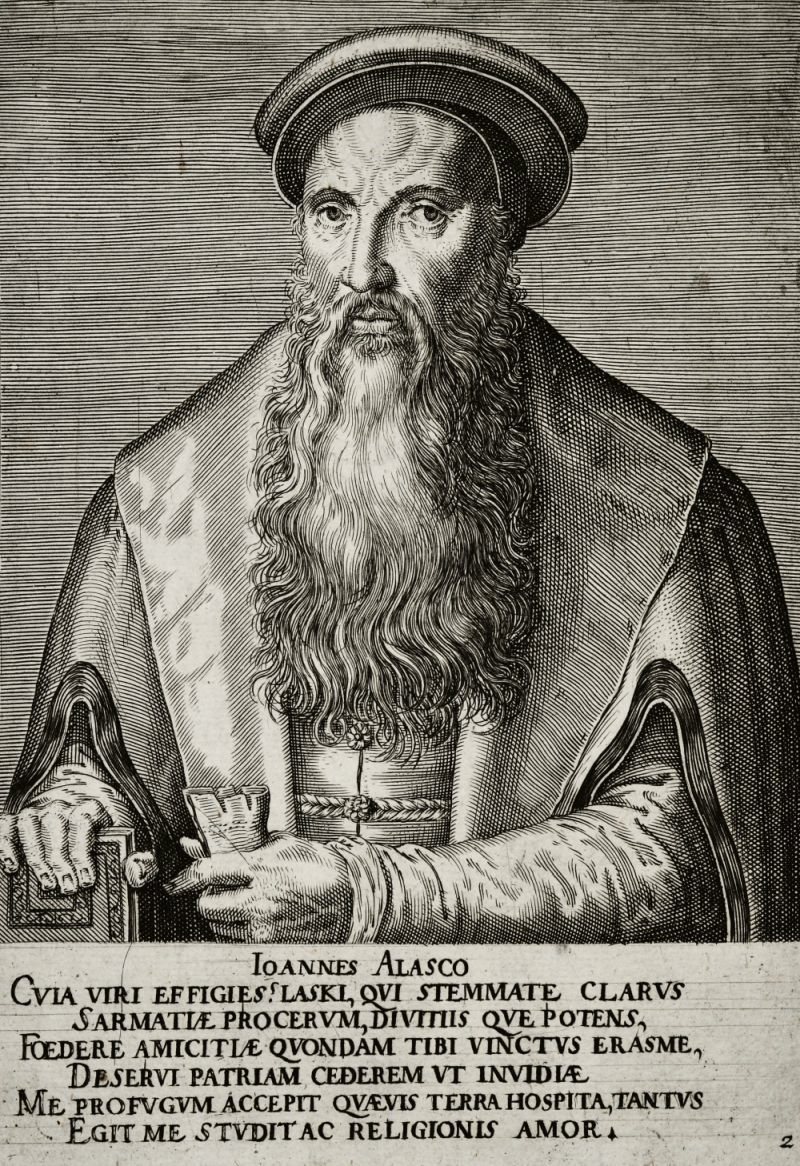
- A copper engraved portrait of Łaski, 1572
- Born: 1499; Łask, Sandomierz Voivodeship, Crown of the Kingdom of Poland
- Died: 8 January 1560 (aged 60–61); Pińczów, Sieradz Voivodeship, Crown of the Kingdom of Poland
- Other names: John Laski; Johannes à Lasco
- Movement: Calvinism
- Relatives: Jan Łaski

Jan Łaski or Johannes à Lasco (1499 – 8 January 1560) was a Polish Calvinist reformer. Owing to his influential work in England (1548–1553) during the English Reformation, he is known to the English-speaking world by the Anglicised form John à Lasco (or less commonly, John Laski).

== Life ==
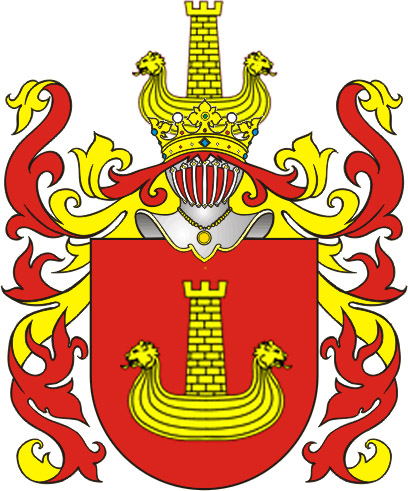
Korab coat-of-arms

Jan Łaski was born in 1499 as the second son of Jarosław Łaski, the voivode of Sieradz, and Zuzanna of Bąkowa Góra. Following Hermann Dalton's claims in his nineteenth-century biography of Łaski, a number of historians have identified the Łaski family's castle in Łask as his place of birth, although recent Polish scholarship concludes that the exact location cannot be ascertained.

His uncle, also Jan Łaski, was the Archbishop of Gniezno, Primate of Poland and Grand Chancellor of the Crown, and he was instrumental in forwarding the early career of his nephew. The coat-of-arms of the Łaski family was Korab.

In 1513 Jan joined his uncle's retinue travelling to Rome, passing through Silesia into Bohemia and then onto Vienna. It is possibly in Vienna that he left the company of his uncle, staying for some time in Leipzig, where the latter directed financial support for his nephew from Rome. There is no record of Łaski undergoing any formal education at the University of Leipzig at that time. He then travelled to Bologna in 1515, where he studied under the guidance of other Polish noblemen. While Eaves and Carter suggest that Łaski studied at the University of Bologna, Janakowski has noted that there is no evidence for that, although it is likely that he may have interacted with the university's teaching staff. Jan stayed in Bologna until 1517 or 1518, and he was referred to as the scholar of Bologna (Bononiensis scolaris) by his uncle in 1517, but the stay did not result in any formal degree.

Using his influence, his uncle secured for him the position of the custodian of Łęczyca in 1517, and in 1518 the young Łaski became canon at both Kraków and Płock. In the same year he left Bologna, much to the chagrin of his uncle, and eventually made his way to Padua, where he remained until 1519, returning to Poland in the same year without an academic degree. He was appointed one of the secretaries to the Polish king Sigismund I upon his return, and in 1521 he took holy orders and was appointed Dean of Gniezno.

In 1523 or 1524 Jan Łaski met Erasmus in Basel, where he returned soon for a prolonged stay in Erasmus's home. There he met Conrad Pellican, who became his instructor in Hebrew, Beatus Rhenanus, who later dedicated to Łaski his commentaries on Pliny, as well as Heinrich Glareanus and Johannes Oecolampadius. Konstanty Żantuan argues that Łaski became Erasmus's favourite pupil and notes that he was later commemorated by the Basel Protestants with a stained glass window with his family coat-of-arms, the Korab, in the room where he lived. The friendship between Erasmus and Łaski culminated in Łaski buying Erasmus's library, which the latter was allowed to keep and use until the end of his life. Łaski's visits to Switzerland also acquainted him with Ulrich Zwingli, whom he visited in Zurich.

In the conflict for the Hungarian crown between John Zápolya and Archduke Ferdinand of Austria, Łaski supported Zápolya, and he was involved, alongside his brother Hieronim, in negotiations with the Turks to secure military support for Zápolya. Zápolya's defeat and the Łaskis' involvement in the affair resulted in their financial ruin, postponing Jan's payment promised to Erasmus for his library until after the latter's death. The money was finally brought to Basel on Łaski's behalf by Andrzej Frycz-Modrzewski in November 1536.

Jan Łaski left Poland in 1538, first travelling to Wittenberg, where he met Philip Melanchthon, with whom he developed a correspondence. He then reached Frankfurt, where he met the theologian Albert Hardenberg; the two moved to Louvain, where in 1540 Jan married Barbara, the daughter of a local merchant. In December that year he moved with his wife to Emden in East Frisia.

In 1542, he became pastor of a Protestant church at Emden. A public library in Emden is named after him. Shortly after his stay in Emden he went to England, where in 1550 he was superintendent of the Strangers' Church of London and had some influence on ecclesiastical affairs in the reign of Edward VI.

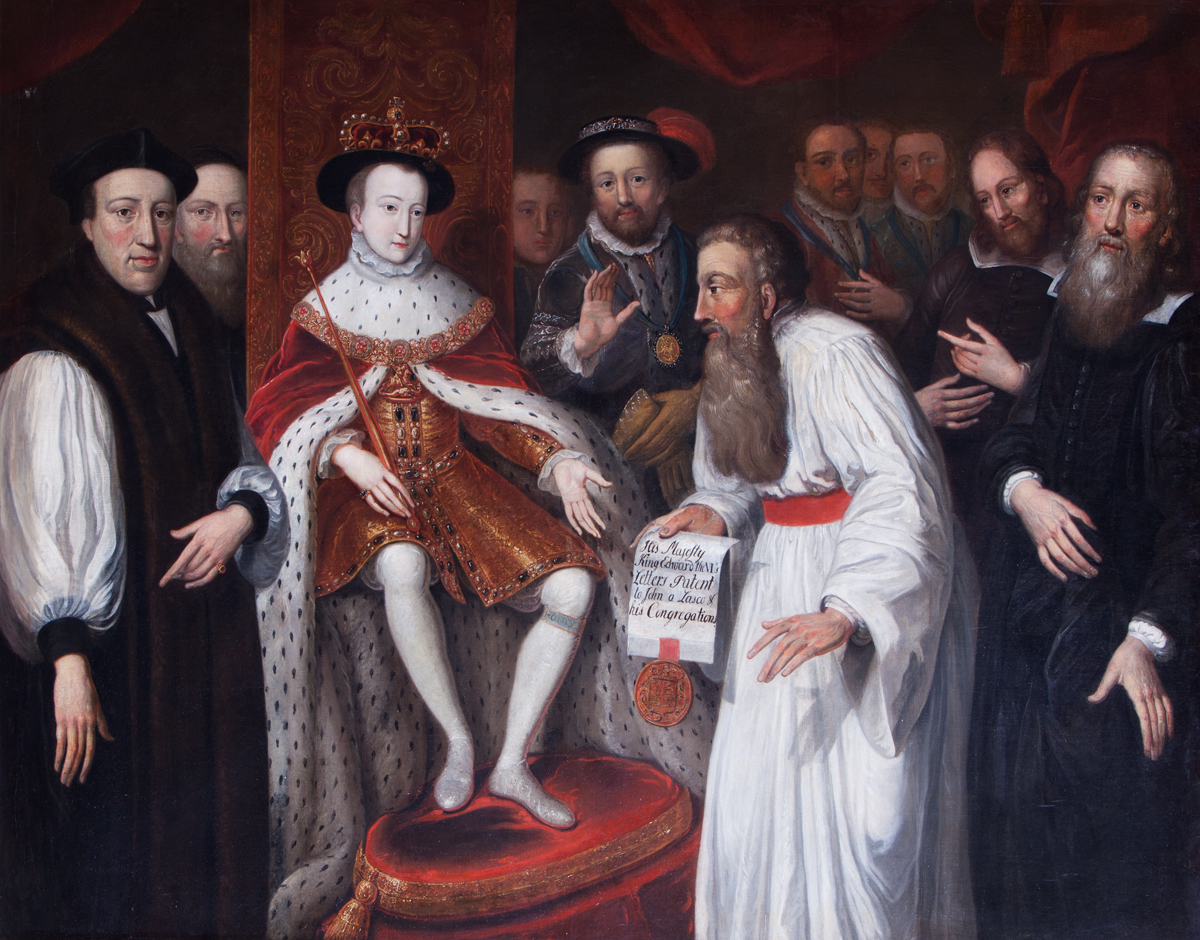
Edward VI Granting Permission to John à Lasco to Set Up a Congregation for European Protestants in London in 1550, painting by Johann Valentin Haidt, circa 1750

Upon the accession of Catholic Queen Mary in July 1553, he fled to Copenhagen with a shipload of refugees from the Strangers' Church. However they were denied refuge there because they would not accept the Augsburg Confession of Faith. They were resettled in Brandenburg. Łaski also helped Catherine Willoughby and her husband after they too had left England. His support enabled them to obtain an appointment from Sigismund II as administrators of Lithuania. Łaski was a correspondent of John Hooper, whom Łaski supported in the vestments controversy.

In 1556, he was recalled to Poland, where he became secretary to King Sigismund II and was a leader in Calvinism.

His contributions to the Calvinist churches were the establishment of church government in theory and practice, a denial of any distinction between ministers and elders except in terms of who could teach and administer the sacraments. A meeting with the Anabaptist Menno Simons in 1544 led Łaski to coin the term "Mennonites" for the followers of Simons.

He died in Pińczów, Poland.

== Works ==
- Forma ac ratio (1550) -- A "Form and Rationale" for the liturgy of the Stranger churches in London. Possibly influenced the 1552 Book of Common Prayer, John Knox's Scottish order, the Middleburg ordinal, the 1563 German Palatinate order, and the "forms and prayers" in Pieter Dathenus' psalter, which was influential in Dutch Calvinist churches.
- Johannes a Lasco, Opera (Works), ed. Abraham Kuyper (Amsterdam: F. Muller, 1866).

== See also ==
- Jan Łaski (1456–1531)
- Andrzej Frycz Modrzewski
- Wacław of Szamotuły
- List of Poles
