= Piątkowski =

Korab coat of arms used by some of Piątkowski family

Piątkowski ([pjɔntˈkɔfski]; feminine: Piątkowska, plural: Piątkowscy) is a Polish surname. Some of them use: Grzymała coat of arms, Korab coat of arms, Ogończyk coat of arms, Szeliga coat of arms or Ślepowron coat of arms.

Notable people with the surname include:

- Aleksandra Piątkowska, Polish diplomat
- Andrzej Piątkowski (1934–2010), Polish sabreur
- Dominika Piątkowska (born 1986), Polish figure skater
- Edmund Piątkowski (1936–2016), Polish track and field athlete
- Eric Piatkowski (born 1970), American basketball player
- Ewa Piątkowska, Polish boxer
- Ewa Piątkowska (volleyball), Polish volleyball player
- Kamil Piątkowski, Polish footballer
- Maria Piątkowska (1931–2020), Polish sprinter, hurdler, and long jumper
- Mateusz Piątkowski (born 1984), Polish footballer
- Monika Piątkowska (born 1974), Polish politician
- Szymon Piątkowski (born 2003), Polish taekwondo practitioner
- Walt Piatkowski (1945–2025), American basketball player
- Wanda Piątkowska (born 1960), Polish rower
- Zenon Piątkowski (1902–1967) was a Polish sports shooter

== See also ==
- Starkowiec Piątkowski, a village in Greater Poland
- Załazek Piątkowski, a village in Subcarpathian Voivodeship in Poland
