= Jan Łaski (1456–1531) =

Polish nobleman (1456–1531)

- Archbishop of Gniezno; Primate of Poland
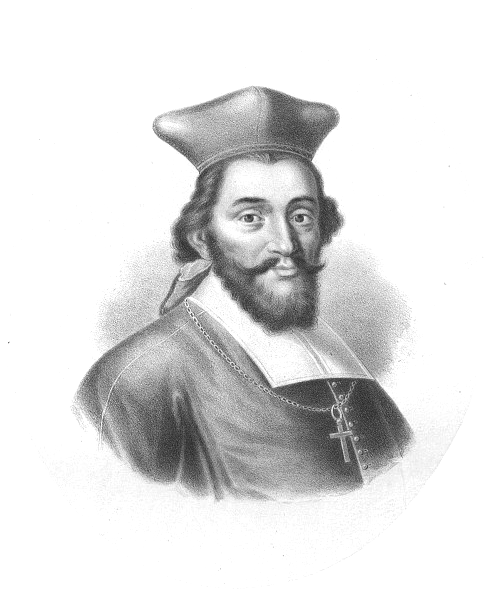
- Installed: 1510 - 1531

Personal details
- Born: 1456 Łask, Kingdom of Poland
- Died: 19 May 1531 (aged 74–75) Kalisz, Kingdom of Poland
- Coat of arms: Jan Łaski's coat of arms

Jan Łaski (1456 in Łask – 19 May 1531 in Kalisz, Poland) was a Polish nobleman, Grand Chancellor of the Crown (1503–10), diplomat, from 1490 secretary to Poland's King Casimir IV Jagiellon and from 1508 coadjutor to the Archbishop of Lwów.

From 1510 Łaski was Archbishop of Gniezno and thus Primate of Poland.

== Biography ==
He was the uncle of his namesake John à Lasco, the noted Protestant reformer, who helped reform the Church of England, and who was called home by King Sigismund II to effect similar reforms in the Commonwealth. John à Lasco is also famous for his achievement as an auto-didact..

=== Secretary to the Chancellor ===
He became a priest, and in 1495 was secretary to the Polish chancellor Zawisza Kurozwęcki, in which position he acquired both influence and experience. The aged chancellor entrusted the sharp-witted young ecclesiastic with the conduct of several important missions. Twice, in 1495 and again in 1500, he was sent to Rome, and once on a special embassy to Flanders, of which he has left an account. On these occasions he had the opportunity of displaying diplomatic talent of a high order.

=== Secretary to the King ===
Polish king (left) and Chancellor Jan Łaski

On the accession to the Polish throne in 1501 of Alexander Jagiellon, who had little knowledge of Polish affairs and chiefly resided in Lithuania, Łaski was appointed by the senate the king's secretary, in which capacity he successfully opposed the growing separatist tendencies of the grand-duchy and maintained the influence of Catholicism there.

=== Chancellor of Poland ===
So struck was the king by his ability that on the death of the Polish chancellor in 1503 he passed over the vice-chancellor Macics Dzewicki and confided the great seal to Łaski. As chancellor Łaski supported the szlachta, or country-gentlemen, against the lower orders, going so far as to pass an edict excluding henceforth all plebeians from the higher benefices of the church. Nevertheless, he approved himself such an excellent public servant that the new king, Sigismund I, made him one of his chief counsellors.

=== Primate of Poland ===
In 1511, the chancellor, who ecclesiastically was still only a canon of Kraków, obtained the coveted dignity of archbishop of Gnesen which carried with it the primacy of the Polish church. In the long negotiations with the restive and semi-rebellious Teutonic Order, Łaski rendered Sigismund most important political services, proposing as a solution of the question that Sigismund should be elected grand master, while Łaski should surrender the primacy to the new candidate of the knights, Albert, Duke in Prussia, a solution which would have been far more profitable to Poland than the ultimate settlement of 1525. In 1513, Łaski was sent to the Lateran council, convened by Pope Julius II, to plead the cause of Poland against the knights, where both as an orator and as a diplomatist he brilliantly distinguished himself. This mission was equally profitable to his country and himself, and he succeeded in obtaining from the pope for the archbishops of Gnesen the title of legati nati.

In his old age, Łaski's partiality for his nephew, Hieronymus Jaroslaw Łaski, led him to support the candidature of John Zápolya, the protégé of the Turks, for the Hungarian crown so vehemently against the Habsburgs that Clement VII excommunicated him; the shock of this disgrace may have been the cause of his sudden death in 1531, although this hasn't been proven.

== Works ==
- Commune incliti Poloniae regni privilegium (1506; Łaski's Statute; in Polish, Statut Łaskiego)

=== Collections of synodal legislation ===
- Statuta provincialia (1512)
- Sanctiones ecclesiasticae tam expontificum decretis quam ex constitutionibus synodorum provinciae excerptae, in primis autem statuta in diversis provincialibus synodis a se sancita (1525)
- Statuta provinciae Gnesnensis (Kraków, 1527)
- De Ruthenorum nationibus eorumque erroribus (Nuremberg)

== See also ==
- List of Polish people § Religion

Catholic Church titles
Preceded by Andrzej Boryszewski	Primate of Poland; Archbishop of Gniezno; 1510–1531	Succeeded by Maciej Drzewiecki
