= Artur Golański =

Polish footballer

Personal information
- Full name: Artur Golański
- Date of birth: 25 April 1992 (age 34)
- Place of birth: Łask, Poland
- Height: 1.85 m (6 ft 1 in)
- Position: Midfielder

Youth career
- 2004–2005: MULKS Łask
- 2005–2006: Włókniarz Pabianice
- 2006–2010: ŁKS Łódź

Senior career*
Years	Team	Apps	(Gls)
2010–2013	ŁKS Łódź	24	(1)
2013–2014	Pelikan Łowicz	14	(0)
2014–2017	ŁKS Łódź	76	(18)
2017–2019	Lechia Tomaszów Mazowiecki	48	(9)
2019–2020	GKS Bełchatów	31	(2)
2020–2021	Chojniczanka Chojnice	18	(1)
2021–2022	GKS Bełchatów	16	(4)
2022	Sokół Aleksandrów Łódzki	12	(3)
2022–2025	GKS Bełchatów	95	(26)

International career
2011	Poland U19	1	(0)
- * Club domestic league appearances and goals as of 14:46, 9 June 2025 (UTC)

Artur Golański (born 25 April 1992) is a Polish professional footballer who plays as a midfielder.

== Career ==
In June 2010, he signed a three-year contract with ŁKS Łódź.

On 29 July 2020, he signed with Chojniczanka Chojnice. A year later, he moved to GKS Bełchatów.

== Honours ==
ŁKS Łódź

- I liga: 2010–11

GKS Bełchatów

- IV liga Łódź: 2022–23
