= Sieradz Voivodeship =

Administrative division and local government in Poland between 1975–1998

Coordinates: 51°35′34″N 18°43′50″E

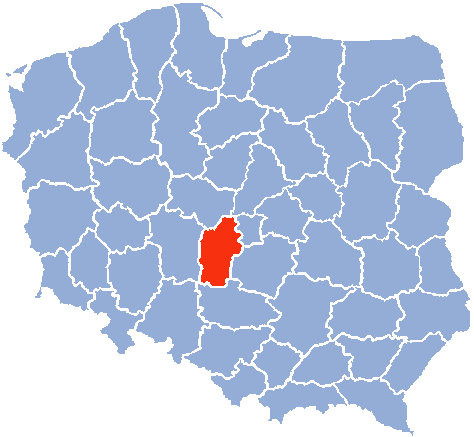
Sieradz Voivodeship 1975-1998

Sieradz Voivodeship (Polish: województwo sieradzkie) was a unit of administrative division and local government in Poland in the years 1975–1998, superseded by Łódź Voivodeship.

A Voivodeship is an area administered by a voivode (Governor), and the Sieradz Voivodeship is the area with the capital city of Sieradz. Sieradz is a significant city of Poland as it is one of the oldest cities of the country, tracing back roughly to the 6th century.

== 1975-1998 ==
Capital city: Sieradz

Major cities and towns: (population in 1995):

- Zduńska Wola (45,900);
- Sieradz (44,700);
- Wieluń (25,500);
- Łask (20,200).

See also:

- Voivodeships of Poland

== 1939-1945 ==
The city of Sieradz was attacked by Germany on September 9, 1939, and was reluctantly home to one of many overpopulated German prisoner-of-war camps. In these camps occurred countless atrocities including torture, slavery/forced labor, starvation, unsafe conditions, beatings, executions, and any more of the common war crimes committed by the German army during WWII.

== 1772-1795 ==
Sieradz Voivodeship was a unit of administrative division and local government in Poland from 14th century to the partitions of Poland in 1772–1795. It was a part of Greater Poland province.
