= Hieronymus Łaski =

Polish diplomat (1496–1542)

Hieronim (Jarosław) Łaski
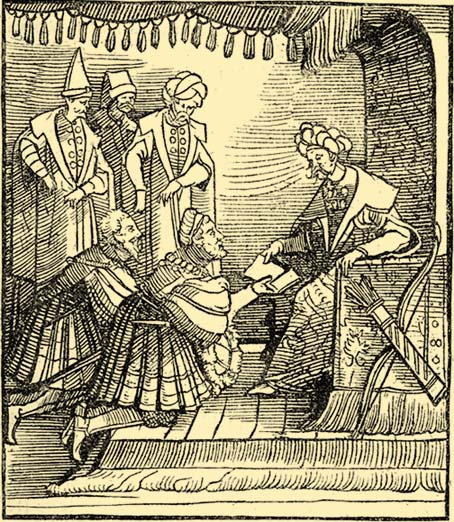
- Coat of arms: Korab
- Born: 27 September 1496
- Died: 22 December 1542 (aged 46)
- Noble family: Łaski
- Spouse: Anna Kurozwęcka
- Issue: Olbracht Łaski, Barbara, Jadwiga Ciołek
- Father: Jarosław Łaski

Hieronymus (Jarosław) Laski, Lasky, Laszki, Laszky, Laskó, Jeromos, Jerome, Hieronym, Hieronim, (27 September 1496 – 22 December 1542) was a Polish diplomat born of an illustrious Polish family. Laski was the nephew of Archbishop John Laski and served as palatine of Inowrocław and of Sieradz.

== Biography ==
Laski's first important mission was to Paris in 1524, ostensibly to contract an anti-Turkish league with the French king François I, but really to bring about a matrimonial alliance between the French king's second son Henri, afterwards Henry II, and the daughter of the King of Poland Sigismund I, a project which failed through no fault of Laski's. (The oldest French prince, styled the Dauphin, had been engaged years before to Princess Mary of England).

The collapse of the Hungarian monarchy at the Battle of Mohács (1526) first opened up a wider avenue for Laski's adventurous activity. Contrary to the wishes of his own sovereign, Sigismund I, whose pro-Austrian policy he detested, Laski entered the service of John Zápolya, the Magyar competitor for the Hungarian throne, thereby seriously compromising Poland both with the Emperor of the Holy Roman Empire and with the Pope. Zápolya despatched him on an embassy to Paris, Copenhagen and Munich for help. France granted Zápolya 20,000 in gold, five thousand of which was to be forwarded immediately, but on Laski's return, he found his patron a refugee in Transylvania, whither he had retired after his defeat by Ferdinand I in the Battle of Tarcal in 1527.

In February 1528, Laski arranged for the king of Hungary, Zápolya, to become a vassal to the Ottoman Empire. Laski went still further, and without the authority for his action concluded a ten years' truce between his old master King Sigismund of Poland and the Porte. He then returned to Hungary at the head of 10,000 men, with whose aid he enabled Zapolya to re-establish his position and defeat Ferdinand at Saros-Patak. He was rewarded with the countship of Zips and the governor-generalship of Transylvania.

=== Conspiracy ===
In the 1530s Laski conspired with Lodovico Gritti, the son of the Doge of Venice and Suleiman against King Zápolya, the man he had helped so much. The plan called for Gritti to become the king of Hungary and Laski to be awarded Transylvania. But nothing came of this because Zápolya had discovered the plot and arrested Laski, imprisoned him in 1534. In 1535 Laski was freed with help of influential friends. On being released by the interposition of the Polish grand hetman, Jan Tarnowski, Laski became a violent opponent of Zapolya, and openly changed his allegiance, allying himself with Ferdinand I.

In 1539 Ferdinand sent Lasky to Constantinople, to denounce the existence and details of the secret treaty of Nagyvárad (1538), to prevent Suleiman from helping Zapolya against a planned Habsburg offensive. He was threatened by Suleiman with having his ears and nose cut off for having betrayed Zapolya and for his new alliance with Ferdinand. Laski escaped harm but his influence excited the jealousy of the Magyars, and Zápolya was persuaded to imprison him. He remained a prisoner in Belgrade for some months, accused of the murder of Suleiman's supporter, Antoine de Rincon, ambassador of the King of France to the Sultan between 1532 and 1541).

Shortly after his return to Poland, Laski died suddenly at Kraków, possibly poisoned by one of his innumerable enemies.

== Remembrance ==
He is one of the characters on the famous painting by Jan Matejko, Prussian Homage.

Political offices
Preceded by Bálint Török	Voivode of Transylvania for John Zápolya; 1530–1534	Succeeded by István Majláth
