= Andrzej Boryszewski =

Roman Catholic bishop

His Excellency Andrzej Boryszewski
- Archbishop of Gniezno; Primate of Poland
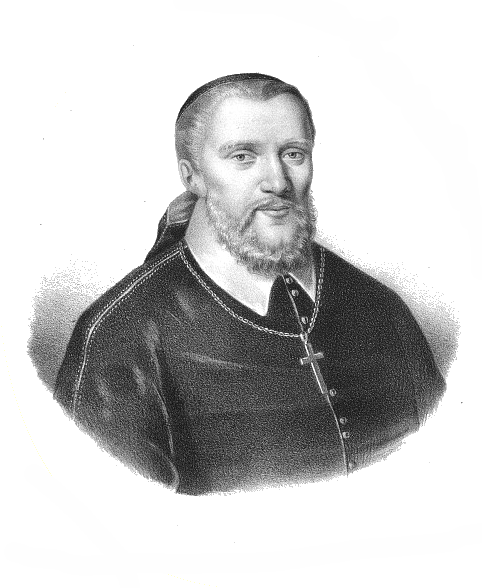
- Church: Roman Catholic
- Archdiocese: Gniezno
- Installed: 1503
- Term ended: 1510

Orders
- Ordination: unknown
- Consecration: unknown

Personal details
- Born: 1435
- Died: 20 April 1510 (aged 74–75) Łowicz
- Coat of arms

Andrzej Boryszewski (1435 – 20 April 1510) was a Polish Roman Catholic priest. His father was the castellan of Zawichost. Boryszewski was coadjutor bishop of Lviv in the years 1488–1493, metropolitan archbishop of Lviv in the years 1493–1503, apostolic administrator of Przemyśl in 1501 –1503, metropolitan archbishop of Gniezno and the primate of Poland in the years 1503–1510, interrex.

He died in Łowicz and was buried at the cathedral in Gniezno.
