= Olbracht Łaski =

Polish nobleman, alchemist and courtier

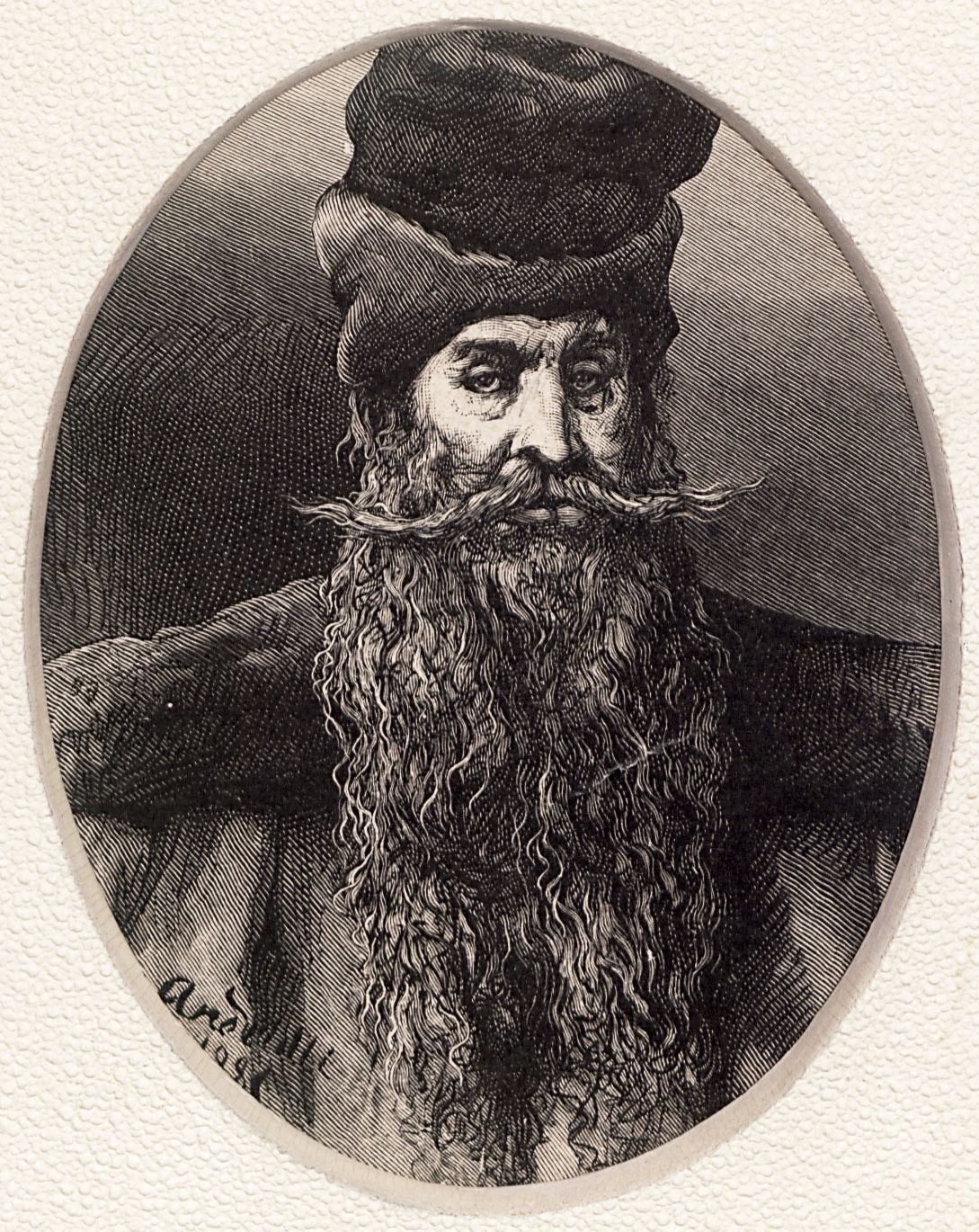
Olbracht Łaski

Olbracht Łaski (Note: Also referred to as Alasco, Alaski, Lasco, Laskey, Lasqui in English sources; see the Elizabethan Court Day by Day for examples.) (1533-23 November 1604) was a Polish nobleman, an alchemist and courtier during the reign of Stephen Batory. His father was the diplomat Heironymus Łaski.

Łaski was suspected of plotting to seize the Polish throne in 1575, following the brief reign of Henry Valois. This episode is featured in the opéra-comique Le roi malgré lui by Emmanuel Chabrier (first performed on 18 May 1887).

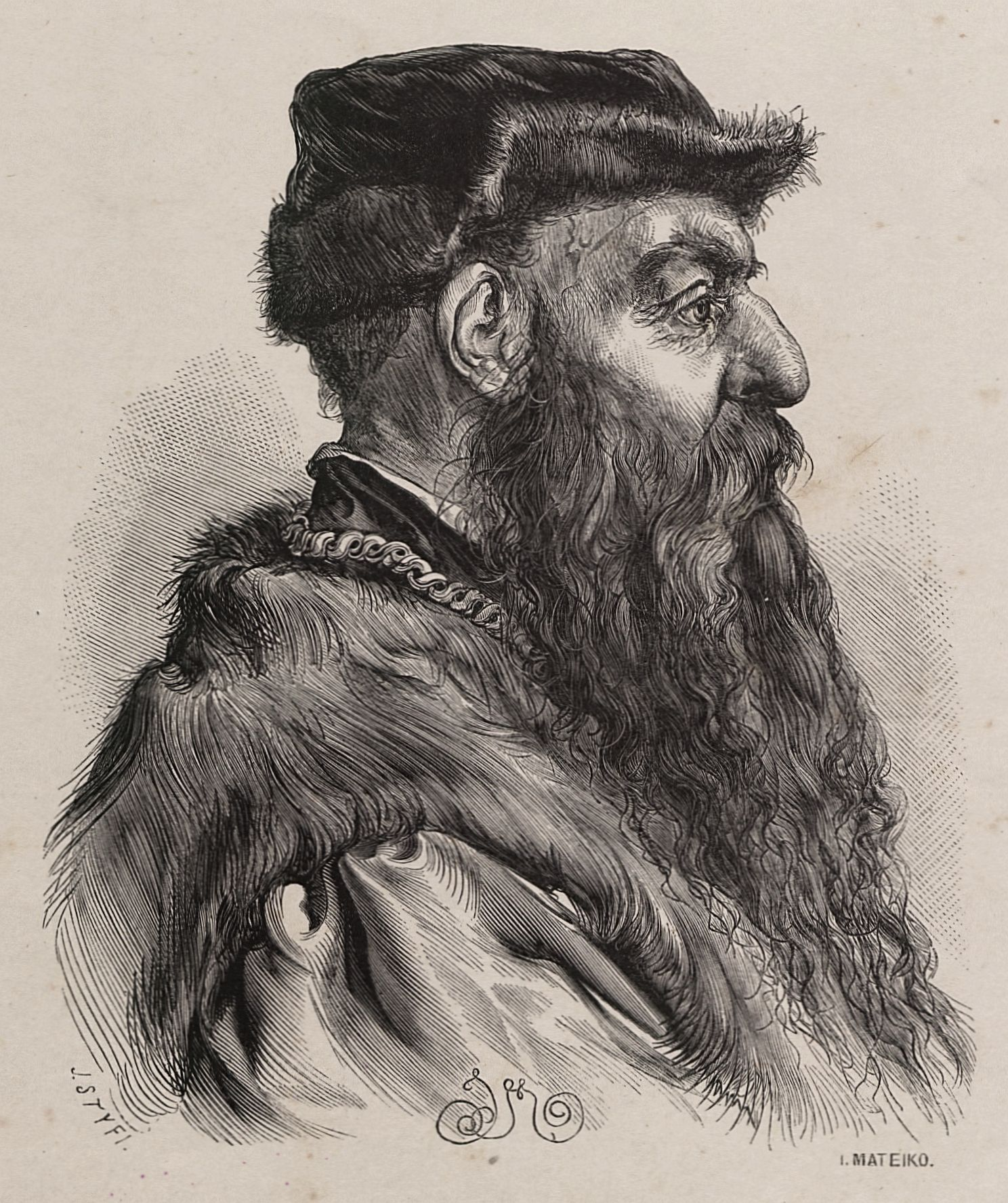
Olbracht Łaski

Łaski was particularly notable for his fine beard, which Holinshed noted was of "such length and breadth, as that lying in his bed, and parting it with his hands, the same overspread his breasts and shoulders, himself greatly delighting therein, and reputing it an ornament."

Łaski arrived in England in April 1583, and stayed for almost 5 months at his own expense, saying that he "came of his...earnest desire only to see Elizabeth I, saying he had heard and read so much of her rare virtues, and high perfections..." Łaski and the Queen had many conversations in Latin, French and Italian, and she hosted a tilting tournament for him at Greenwich. He visited Nonsuch and Oxford.

The French ambassador, Michel de Castelnau suggested that his visit was prompted by a desire to persuade the Muscovy Company to refrain from selling arms to Ivan the Terrible. He was provided with lodgings at Winchester House, Southwark. Łaski visited John Dee at least three times, and convinced him to visit Poland.
