= Pennant of the president of the Republic of Poland =

- Proportion: 5:6
- Adopted: 1996; 30 years ago
- Design: Crowned White Eagle in a red field bordered with a white wavy line

The pennant of the president of the Republic of Poland, Commander-in-Chief of the Armed Forces of the Republic of Poland (Polish: proporzec Prezydenta Rzeczypospolitej Polskiej – Zwierzchnika Sił Zbrojnych Rzeczypospolitej Polskiej) is a presidential standard (flag) used in the Polish Armed Forces to mark the presence and pay respect to the president of the Republic of Poland who is also ex officio the commander-in-chief of the Armed Forces. The pennant is raised on Polish Navy ships when the president is officially on board, as well as on land, if the president is present. The design of the pennant is based directly on the pre-war Banner of the Republic of Poland which used to be part of presidential insignia.

== Legal specifications ==
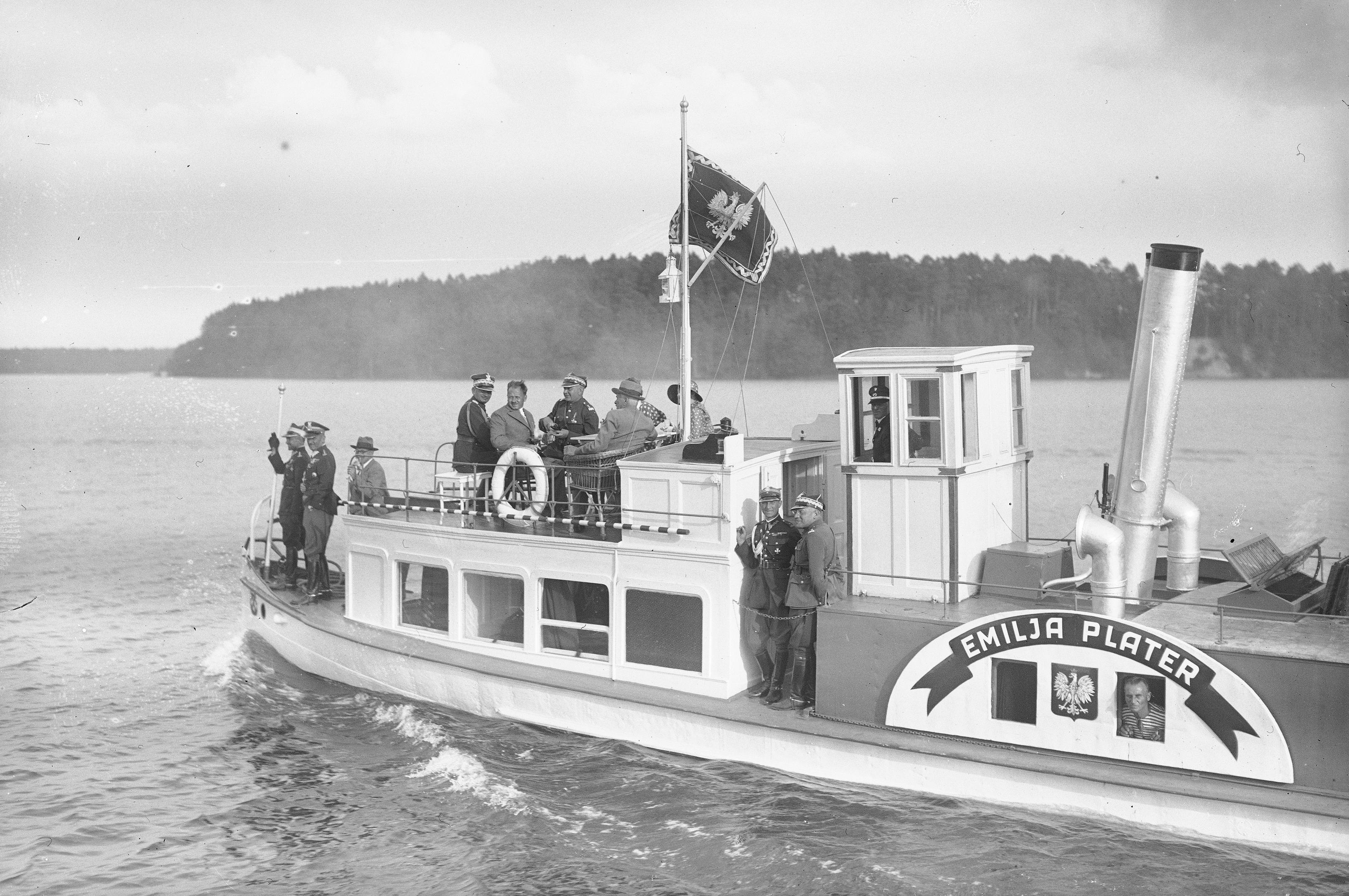
Pennant of the president of the Republic of Poland in Augustów while cruising on the lake (1932)

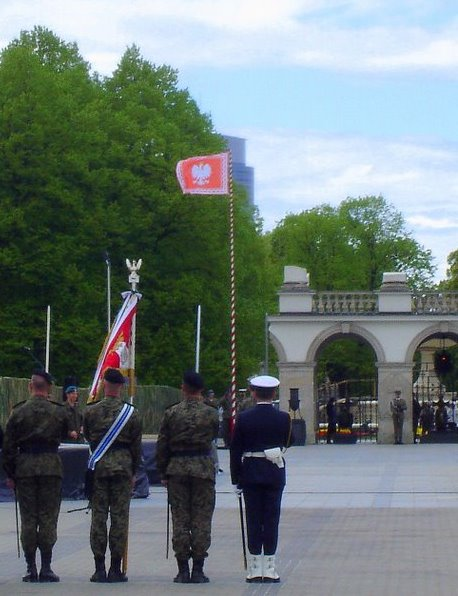
Presidential pennant flying at the Tomb of the Unknown Soldier in Warsaw during a Constitution Day ceremony

The pennant of the president is defined in the Ordinance of the Minister of National Defense on the Use of Insignia of the Armed Forces of January 26, 1996 with subsequent amendments. The ordinance defines the pennant of the president as "a piece of red cloth with the image of the state eagle (i.e. the White Eagle from the national coat of arms) in the middle, bordered with a wężyk generalski", an ornate wavy line used in the Polish military as a symbol of general's rank. The hoist to fly ratio is 5:6. The proportion of the eagle's height to the fly is 3:5.

== Usage ==
The presidential pennant is used in military ceremonies attended by the commander-in-chief. Celebrations of the Constitution Day, May 3; Polish Armed Forces Day, August 15; and Independence Day, November 11 (see Public holidays in Poland) are typical occasions. For example, during the grand military parade on August 15, 2007, in Warsaw, President Lech Kaczyński rode in a convertible jeep preceded by a mounted cavalry officer carrying the presidential pennant, while a smaller pennant was attached to the president's jeep as a car flag. The pennant also draped the coffins of President Kaczyński (see Death and state funeral of Lech Kaczyński and Maria Kaczyńska) and former president-in-exile Ryszard Kaczorowski after both died in the Smolensk air crash of 2010.

== History ==
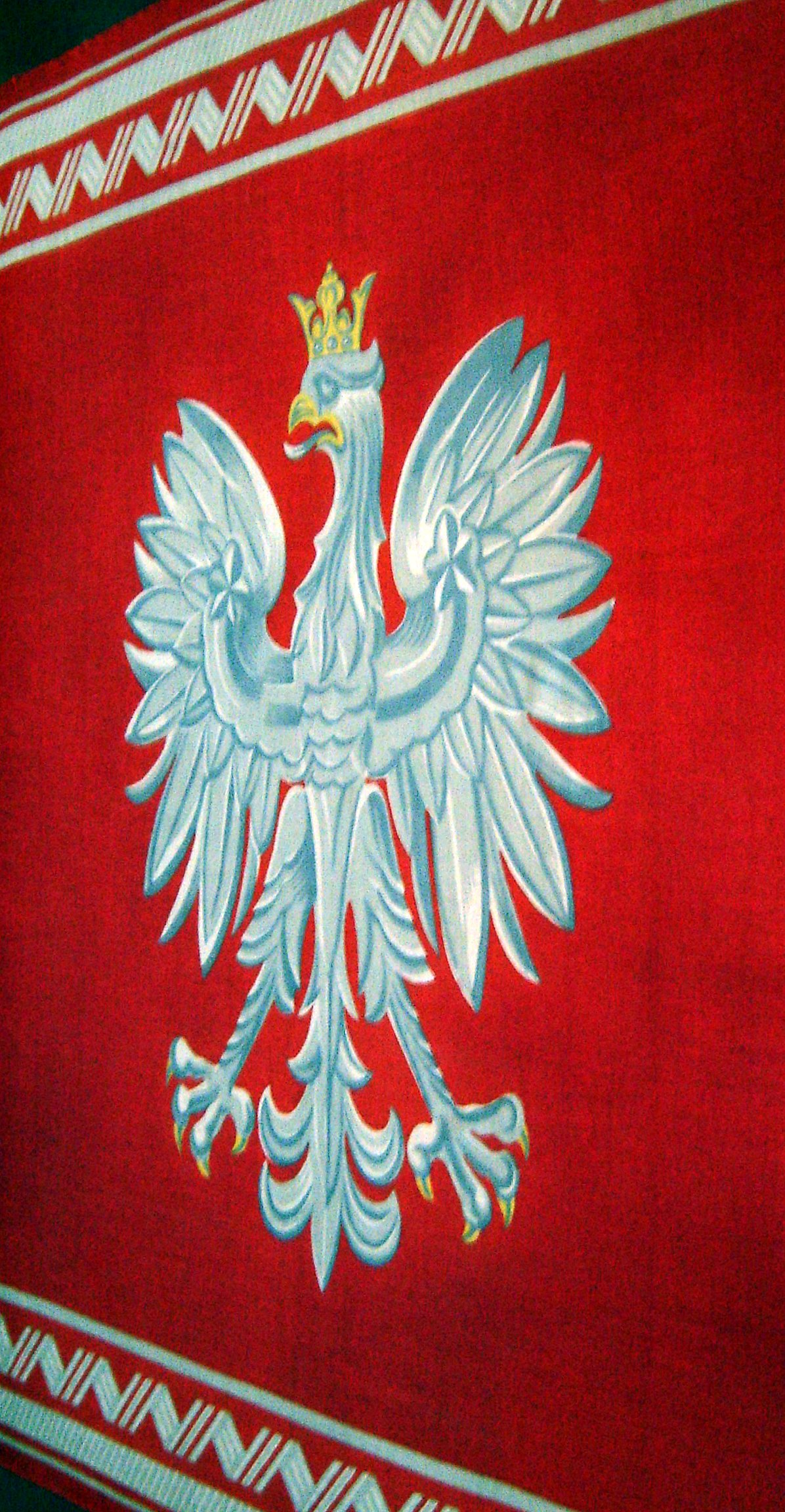
Banner of the Republic on display in the Royal Castle in Warsaw

A state banner was used in Poland as insignia of the head of state (king, president, etc.) as early as the 11th century CE. Although its design changed with time, it was always a heraldic banner, i.e. one based directly on the national coat of arms: a crowned White Eagle in a red field. In 1919, the Sejm (lower house of parliament) established the Banner of the Republic of Poland, reserved for use by the head of state – the State Leader (Naczelnik Państwa) and, later, President of the Republic. In 1927, it was modified to reflect the adoption of a new official rendering of the national coat of arms. At this point the banner was virtually identical to the current design for the presidential pennant.

After the Second World War, the Banner of the Republic was still used by presidents-in-exile while a variant with a crownless eagle was used by communist authorities at home. Officially abandoned in 1955, the banner continued to be used in practice by the prime minister and, during the 1960s, by the Council of State, a collective head of state of the time.

The modern pennant of the president of the Republic of Poland was established by the Minister of National Defense on January 29, 1996, with the sole purpose of flying it on Polish Navy ships while the commander-in-chief is on board. On December 14, 2005, the use of the presidential pennant was extended to all branches of Polish Armed Forces. It was first flown on land during a Constitution Day ceremony at the Tomb of the Unknown Soldier in Warsaw on May 3, 2005.

== See also ==
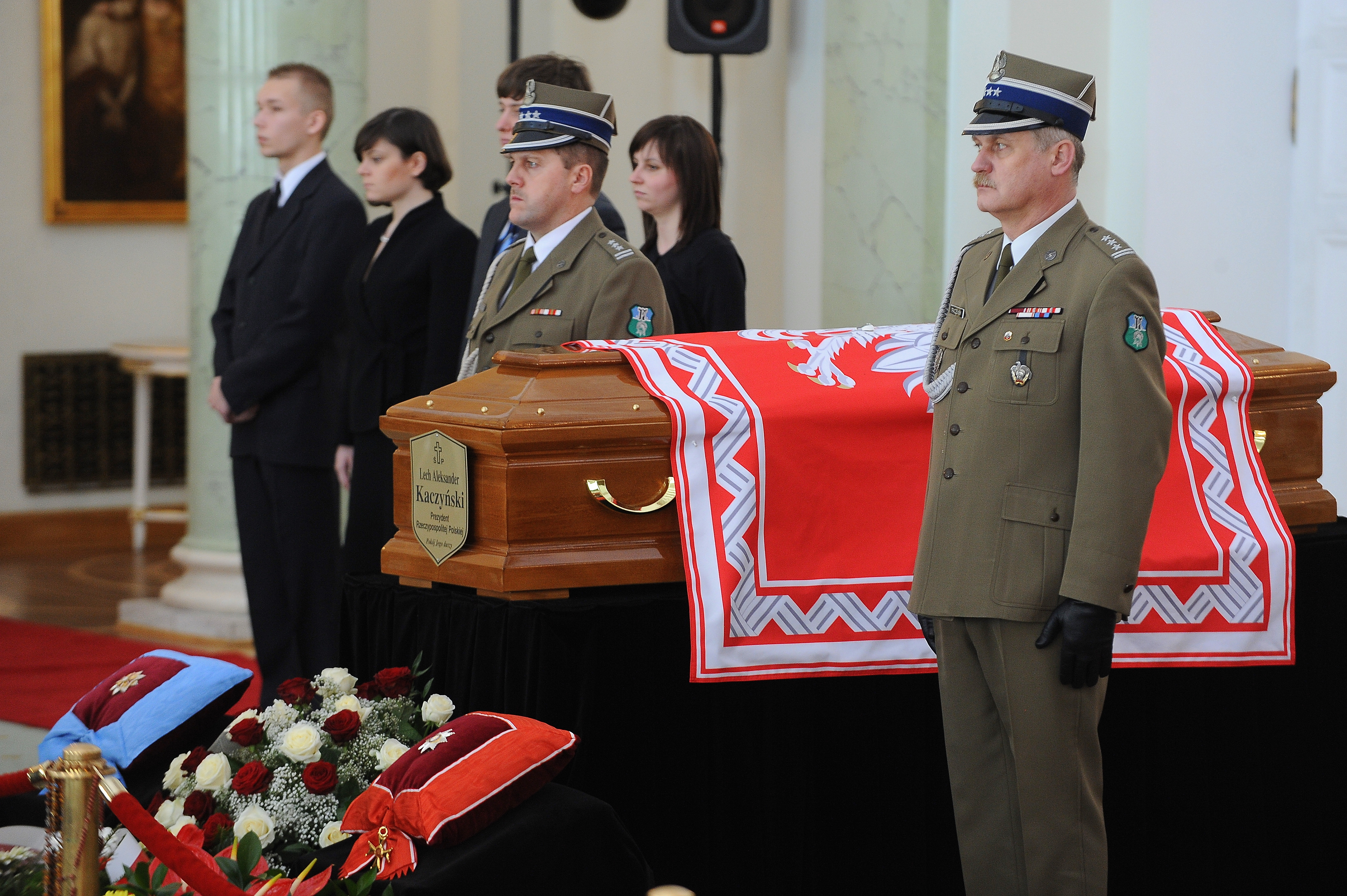
President Lech Kaczyński's coffin draped in the presidential pennant while lying in state

- Banner of Poland
- Flag of Poland
- Coat of arms of Poland
- President of the Republic of Poland
- List of Polish flags
