= Ciołek's Missal =

1515 Polish illuminated missal

Ciołek's Missal

Ciołek's Missal is one of the oldest relics of Polish literature. Made in 1515, in Kraków, for Erazm Ciołek, the Archbishop of Płock it was decorated with figural initials, rich borders with motives of crests of the owner (Sulima Coat of Arms).
