= Erazm Ciołek (bishop of Płock) =

Polish bishop, diplomat and writer

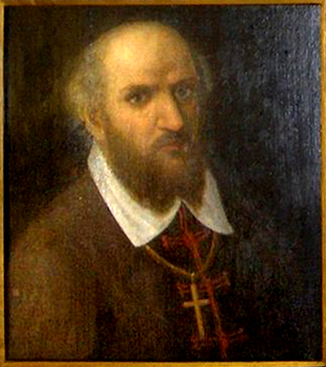
Erazm Ciołek, portrait from the collections of the Muzeum Diecezjalne Płockie

Erazm Ciołek (1474–1522) was a Polish diplomat and writer, Bishop of Płock from 1504 to his death. He was also the author of Ciołek's Missal, one of the oldest works of Polish literature, and patron of the artists.

== Biography ==
Born in 1474 to a burgher family in Kraków, Ciołek graduated from the Kraków Academy with the Master's in 1491. He is not to be confused with Erazm Ciołek from the same family, who received his Master's in 1512. In 1494 Erazm Ciołek (future Bishop of Płock) became the secretary of Polish king Alexander Jagiellon and one of his favorite courtiers. In 1501 he left on a diplomatic mission to Rome, where he received Holy Orders. In Rome, Ciołek discussed Alexander's marriage and possible divorce from Helena of Moscow, who was an Eastern Orthodox. Helena's father, Ivan III of Russia, accused Alexander of religious intolerance and used it as a pretext for the renewed Muscovite–Lithuanian War (1500–1503).

In 1503, with support of the king, he became the bishop of Płock, where he became known as a good administrator, protector of peasants. He became the patron of many artists (like Mikołaj Hussowczyk), and amassed a large book collection. He was also a writer and poet himself and his Ciołek's Missal is considered to be one of the oldest works of Polish literature. He funded many parishes and supported educational institutions (particularly monasteries), Ciołek enforced high standards of education and activity among his priesthood. He renovated the Cathedral of Płock, as well as many other churches.

Active in politics, due to intrigues by his opponents, he lost the favor of king Sigismund I the Old, and did not succeed in his goal of becoming a cardinal. He died in Rome in 1522.

| Preceded by Wincenty Przerębski | Bishop of Płock; 1504–1522 | Succeeded by Rafał Leszczyński |

== Members of family ==
Another member of the Ciołek family known by the same name, entered Kraków Academy in 1507, and upon graduation joined the Cistercian Monastery in Mogiła near Kraków where in 1522 he became an abbot. Erazm Ciołek of Mogiła restored the Monastery to its former glory, and served as ambassador to King Sigismund I. He was appointed Canon of Kraków in 1536 and the Suffragan Bishop in 1544. He died at the Mogiła Abbey on December 6, 1546.
