= Blind Veit Stoss with His Granddaughter =

Painting by Jan Matejko

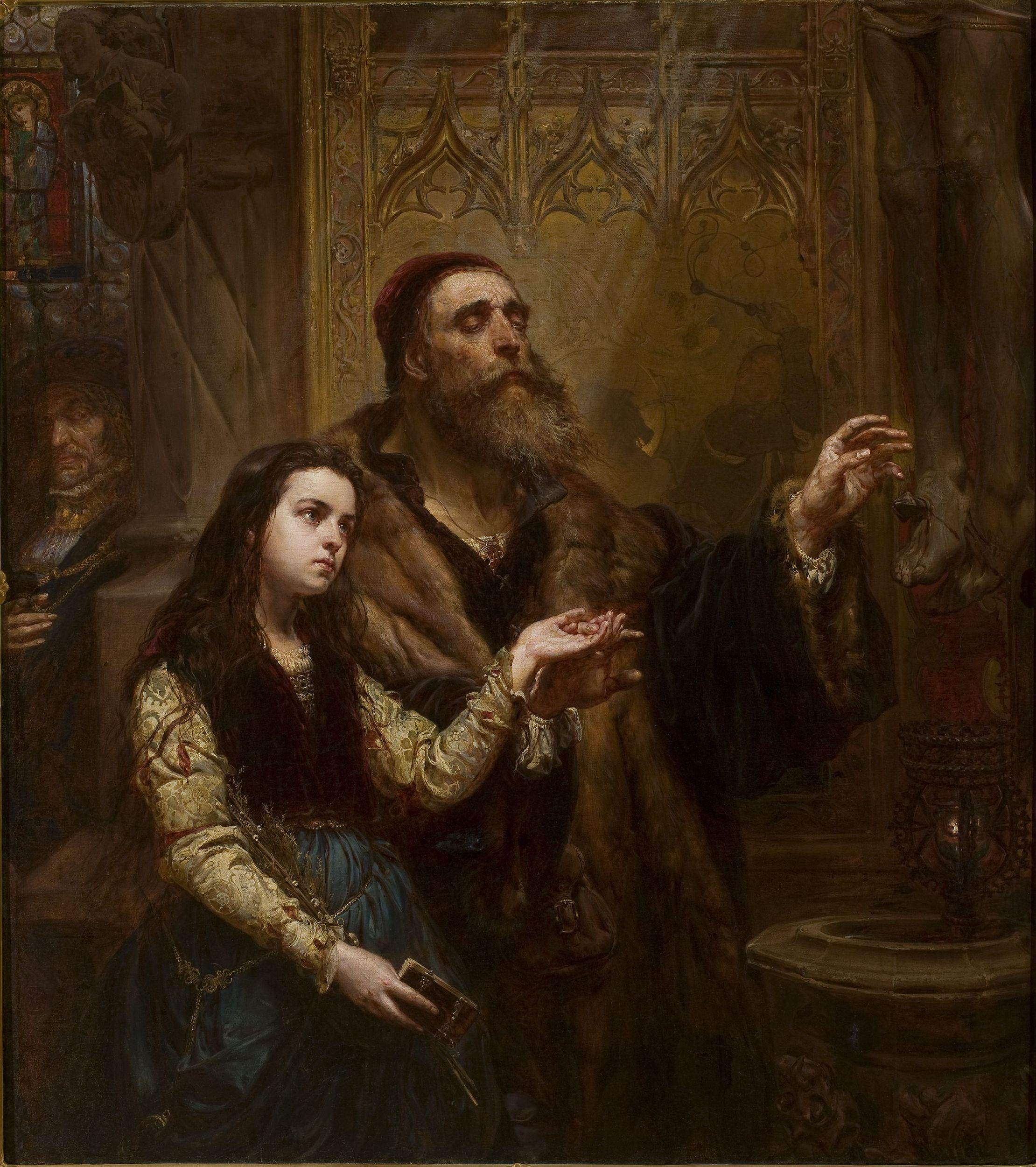
- Artist: Jan Matejko
- Year: 1865
- Medium: Oil on canvas
- Dimensions: 155.5 cm × 140 cm (61.2 in × 55 in)
- Location: National Museum, Warsaw

Blind Veit Stoss with His Granddaughter (Polish: Ociemniały Wit Stwosz z wnuczką) is an oil painting by Jan Matejko painted in 1865. It belongs to the collection of the National Museum in Warsaw.

== History ==
The sculptor Veit Stoss and St. Mary's Basilica in Kraków were sources of artistic inspiration for Matejko. The basilica, which he had known since childhood, was his favorite place for prayer. He had already created portraits of Veit Stoss (Veit Stoss as a child, 1855). Two oil sketches were created for this painting of the blind Veit Stoss with his granddaughter. After the painting was completed in September 1865, it was exhibited in the Prałatówka of St. Mary's Basilica, at the corner of St. Mary's Square and Szpitalna Street in Kraków's Old Town. Matejko donated the income from the sale of tickets from the exhibition in Kraków and photographs of this canvas taken by Karol Beyer to the restoration of St. Mary's Altar, as well as to Kraków's orphanages.

The work was purchased in 1865 by Stanisław Potocki from Brzeżany (now Berezhany). After 1894, it was in the deposit of the Historical Lubomirski Family Museum in Lwów (now Lviv). In 1936, it was donated by Jakub Potocki to the National Museum in Warsaw. The painting was taken by the Germans during the Warsaw Uprising. In 1945 it was regained from Austria. It belongs to the collection of Polish Paintings until 1914 of the National Museum in Warsaw; however, it was displayed in Matejko's family house in Kraków from 2019 to 2020.

== Description ==
The painting shows Veit Stoss being led by his granddaughter inside the porch of a Gothic church. The blind sculptor's cheek bears a mark related to his involvement in the forgery of a bill of exchange. Stoss, in a large fur coat, extends his left hand to the feet of the crucified Christ and the stone stoup. The granddaughter, who has the features of Matejko's young wife Teodora, holds her grandfather's right hand with her left. In her right hand she holds a prayer book and a palm or some other plant. In the background one can see the tracery decoration of the interior. On the left, behind a pillar, a man observes the scene.
