= Stwosz Icefall =

Coordinates: 62°9′S 58°12′W

Stwosz Icefall is an icefall at the outlet of Krakow Dome at the head of Legru Bay on King George Island, Antarctica. It was named by the 1980 Polish Antarctic Expedition after artist Wit Stwosz (c.1445–1533), who carved the wooden altarpiece in Mariacki Church in Kraków between 1477 and 1487.
