= Kraków Dome =

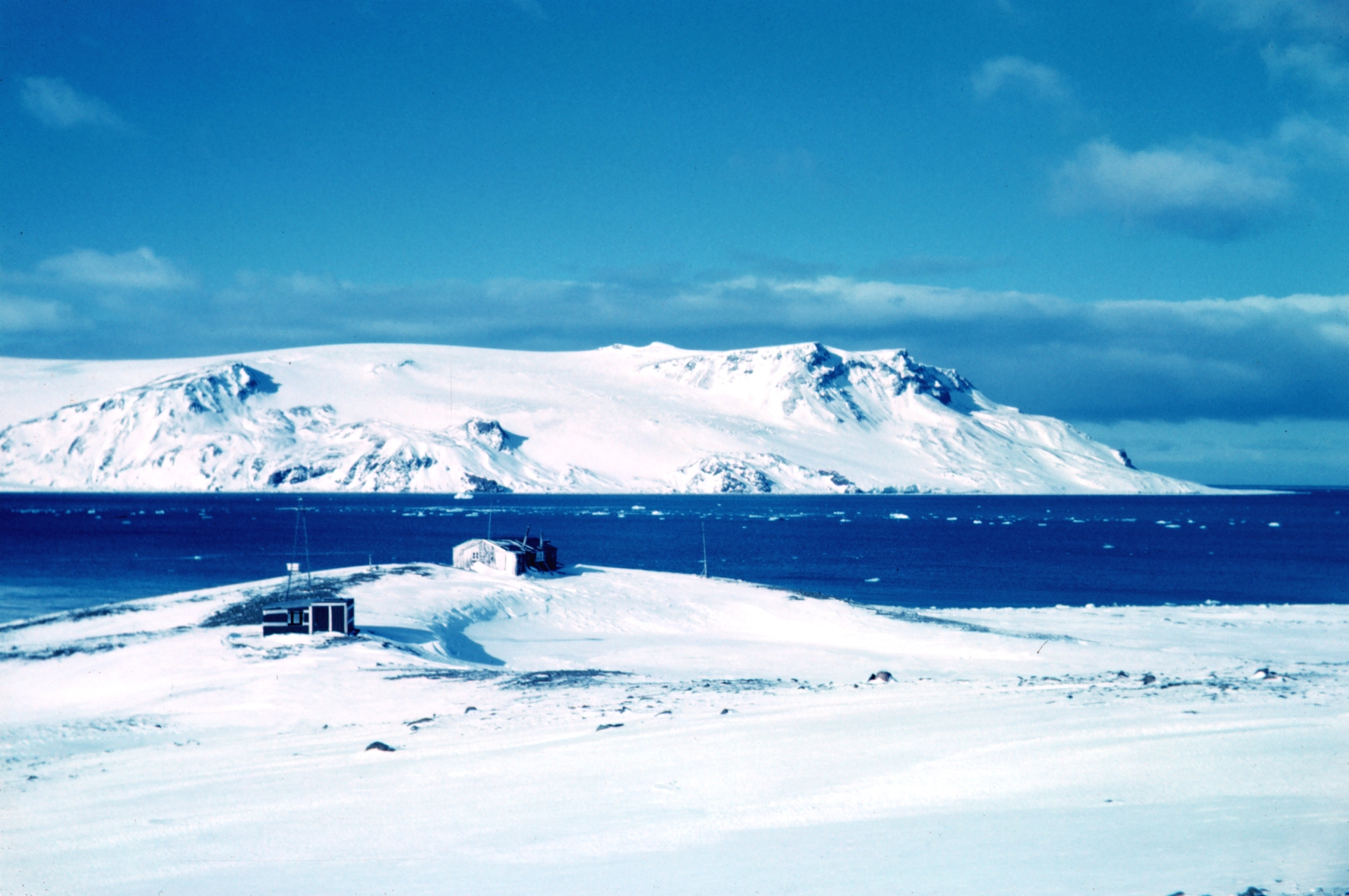
Kraków Dome viewed from across the Admiralty Bay

Kraków Dome (62°7′S 58°15′W) is the ice dome covering Kraków Peninsula, King George Island, in the South Shetland Islands. The name Kopula Krakowa (Kraków Dome), after Kraków, the old capital of Poland, was applied to this feature by the Polish Antarctic Expedition, 1980.

== See also ==
- Stwosz Icefall
