= Harnasie Hill =

Hill in Antarctica

Harnasie Hill (62°11′S 58°16′W) is a steep-sided hill rising to 250 metres (820 ft) between Vauréal Peak and Martins Head in the southern portion of Krakow Peninsula, King George Island, in the South Shetland Islands, Antarctica. It was named "Wierch Harnasie" (Harnasie Hill) by the Polish Antarctic Expedition, 1980, after the opera Harnasie by Karol Szymanowski.
