= Legru Bay =

Bay in Antarctica

Legru Bay (62°10′S 58°12′W) is a bay 2 nautical miles (4 km) wide, indenting the south coast of King George Island, South Shetland Islands, Antarctica, immediately northeast of Martins Head. The French Antarctic Expedition, 1908–10, under Jean-Baptiste Charcot applied the name "Cap Legru" to a feature which has now been identified as Martins Head. As the latter has priority, Charcot's name has been transferred to this bay in order to retain the name in the area in which it was originally given.

== See also ==
- Hull Point
- Stwosz Icefall
