= Carruthers Cliff =

Carruthers Cliff (62°11′S 58°17′W) is a prominent sub-vertical rock cliff forming the south-southeast flank of Vauréal Peak. The cliffs extend inland for about 1,900 to 2,300 feet (580 to 700 m), rising to about 180 metres (600 ft) above sea level. Fossilized wood and leaf remains were discovered near the base of these cliffs in 1996. The cliffs were named for Robert George Carruthers (1880–1965), an English stratigrapher, invertebrate palaeontologist, and quaternary geologist with the British Geological Survey. He was the originator of the undermelt theory in which British glacial deposits resulted from a single glacial advance.
