= Vauréal Peak =

Mountain in King George Island, South Shetland Islands, Antarctica

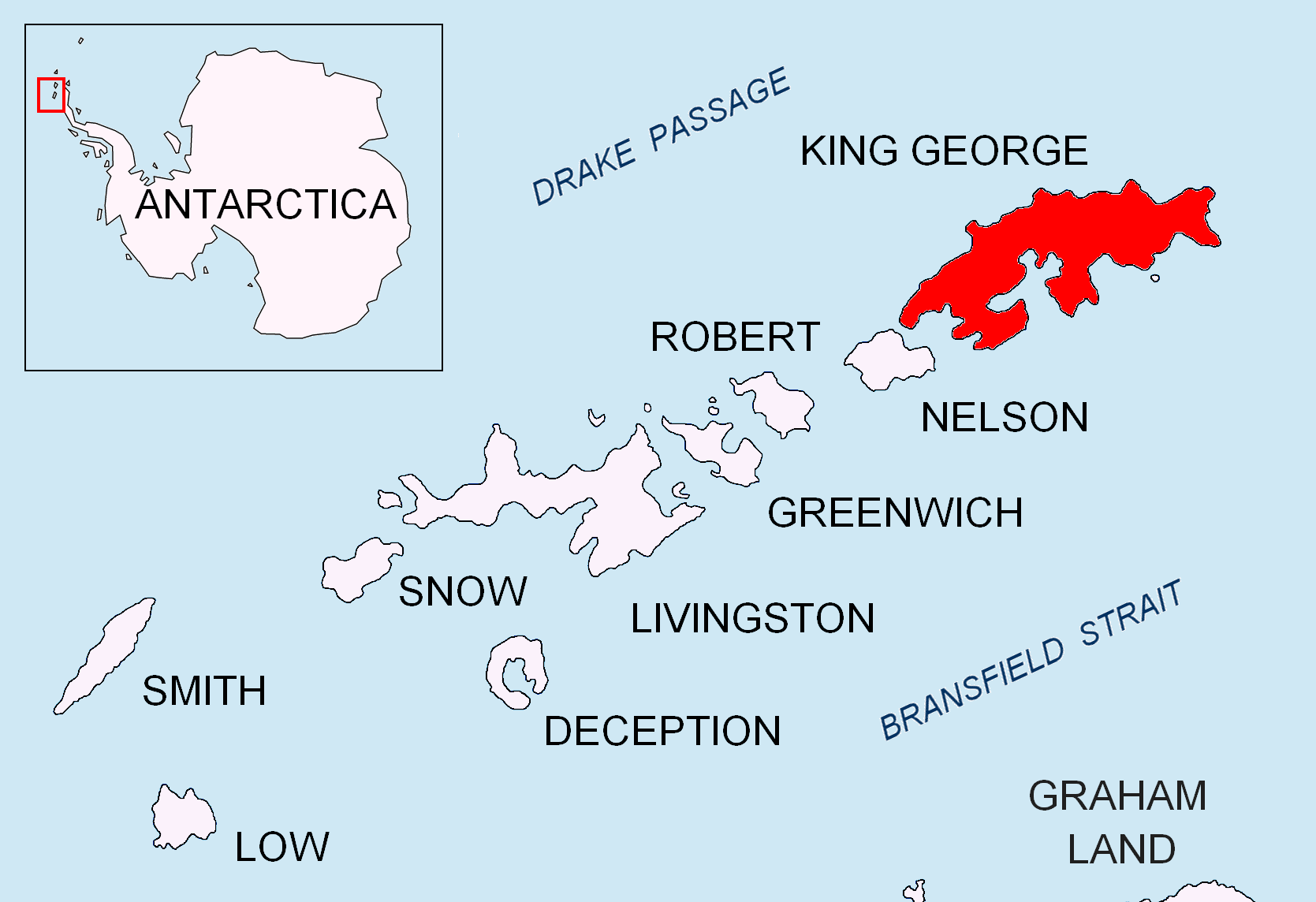
Location of King George Island in the South Shetland Islands.

Vauréal Peak (62°11′S 58°18′W) is a rocky peak at the east side of the entrance to Admiralty Bay, King George Island, in the South Shetland Islands. The name Cap Vauréal was assigned in this location by the French Antarctic Expedition under J.B. Charcot in 1908–10. Air photos now show that the most prominent feature in the vicinity is this peak.

== Maps ==
- Antarctic Digital Database (ADD). Scale 1:250000 topographic map of Antarctica. Scientific Committee on Antarctic Research (SCAR). Since 1993, regularly upgraded and updated.

== See also ==
- Carruthers Cliff
- Harnasie Hill
