= Hull Point =

Hull Point (62°9′S 58°11′W) is a low promontory on the northeast side of Legru Bay on King George Island in the South Shetland Islands, rising about 15 metres (50 ft) above sea level. It comprises a whale-back ridge aligned in a northwest–southeast orientation and is backed on the northeast side by a sandy beach. It was named for Professor Edward Hull, LLD, FRS, FGS, a stratigrapher from Ulster, and a structural and economic geologist. He worked with the British Geological Survey on the coalfields of England and Wales and briefly in Scotland where he compiled outstanding drift maps of Glasgow. He later became the director of the Geological Survey of Ireland.
