= Tobias and the Angel (sculpture) =

Sculptural group by Veit Stoss

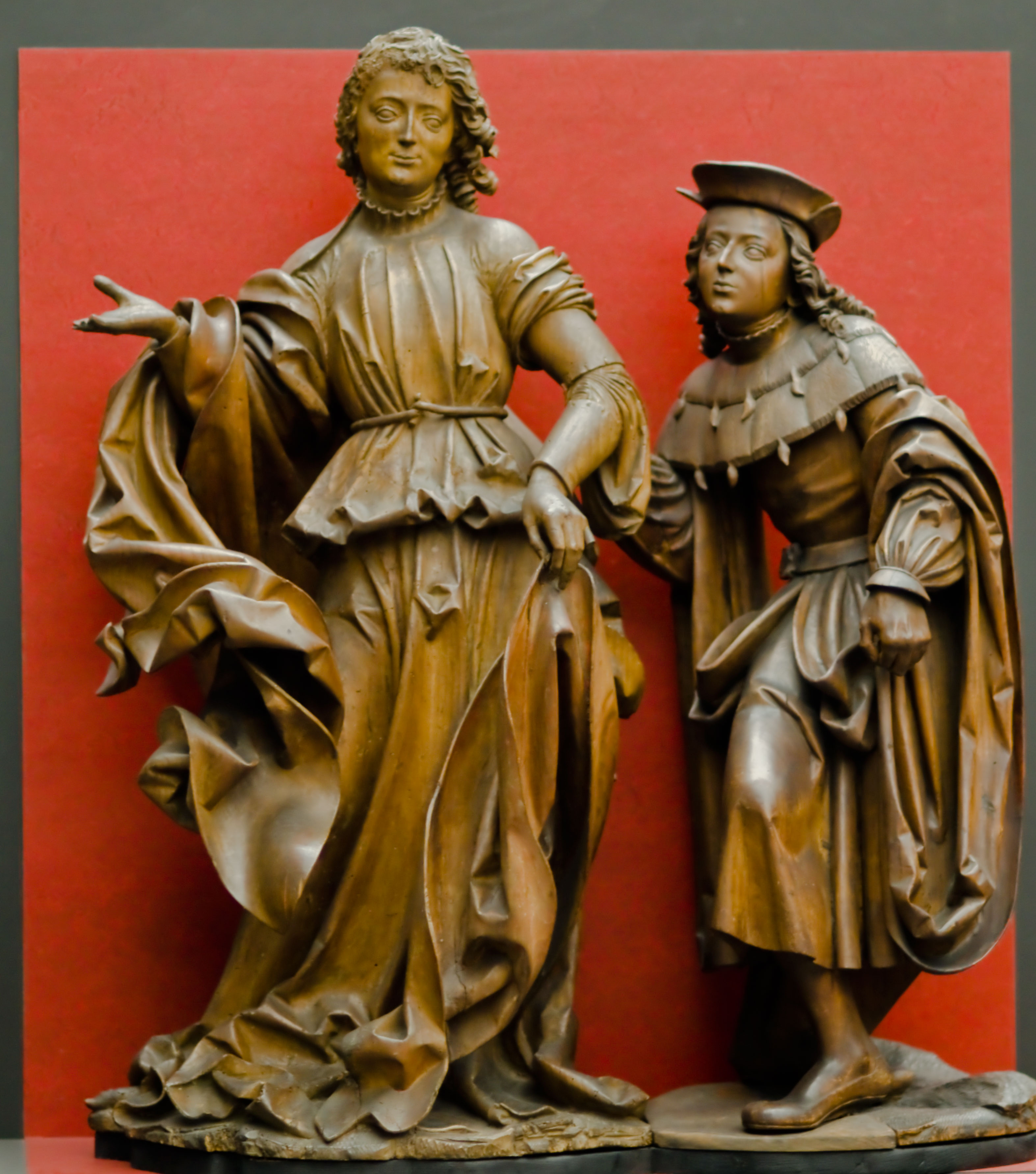

Tobias and the Angel is a group of two limewood sculptures carved in 1516 by Veit Stoss showing Tobias and the Angel, with the archangel Raphael and Tobias, now in the Germanisches Nationalmuseum in Nuremberg. Whilst late Gothic in style, it also shows Italian Renaissance influences first picked up by the artist whilst based in Kraków and working on Piotr of Bnin's tomb in Włocławek Cathedral.

They were commissioned, possibly as votive figures, by Rafaello Torrigiani, a Florentine merchant living in Santo Spirito parish, where his family had their chapel and which also contained the chapel of the Confraternity of Saint Raphael. The latter chapel had an altarpiece by Neri di Bicci and later one by Francesco Botticini (the latter now in the Galleria dell'Accademia), both also showing Raphael and Tobias.

The works' later history is unknown and until the 1930s they were in separate locations, with the archangel in St. Jakob, Nuremberg and Tobias (then mistaken for one of the Magi) in the Germanisches Nationalmuseum. Tobias's missing proper right hand no doubt held a fish, which (with his dog if present) would have identified him. From the 18th century onwards the group was known as "Figure Led by an Angel".
