= Stanisław Stwosz =

Polish sculptor (1478–1528)

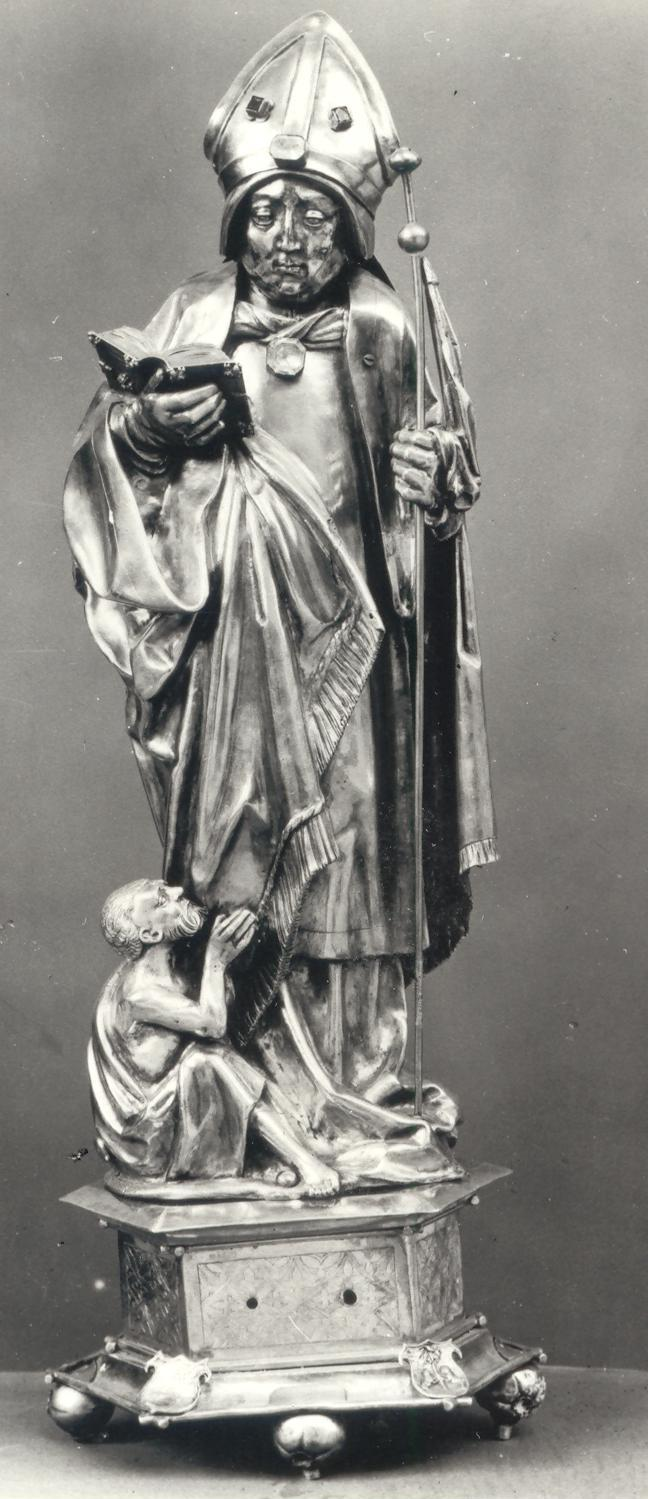
Reliquary - statue of St. Stanislaus by Stanisław Stwosz, (silver sheet, gilding), c. 1500

Stanisław Stwosz, also Stanislaw Stoss, Stanislas Stack, (1478–1528) was a Polish sculptor.

Stwosz was born in Kraków, the son of the sculptor Veit Stoss. He is credited with authorship of King John I Albert's tombstone in the chapel. Corpus Christi in the Wawel Cathedral (along with Jörg Huber of Passau). He is the author of a triptych depicting St. Stanislaus in 1504 on the south porch entrance to St. Mary's Basilica, Kraków (the preserved part) and the King John I Albert triptych located in the Chapel of the Cathedral of the Czartoryski family. He made a sculpture depicting a scene of the Dormition of the Mother of God for the Corpus Christi Church in Biecz.
