= Martins Head =

Martins Head (62°11′S 58°14′W) is a prominent headland forming the south side of the entrance to Legru Bay on the south coast of King George Island, in the South Shetland Islands of Antarctica. The name dates back to at least 1820, when it was described by Edward Bransfield, Master, Royal Navy, during his exploration of these islands.

== See also ==
- Harnasie Hill
