= Veit Stoss altarpiece in Kraków =

Altarpiece in St. Mary's Basilica, Kraków

Coordinates: 50°03′42″N 19°56′21″E

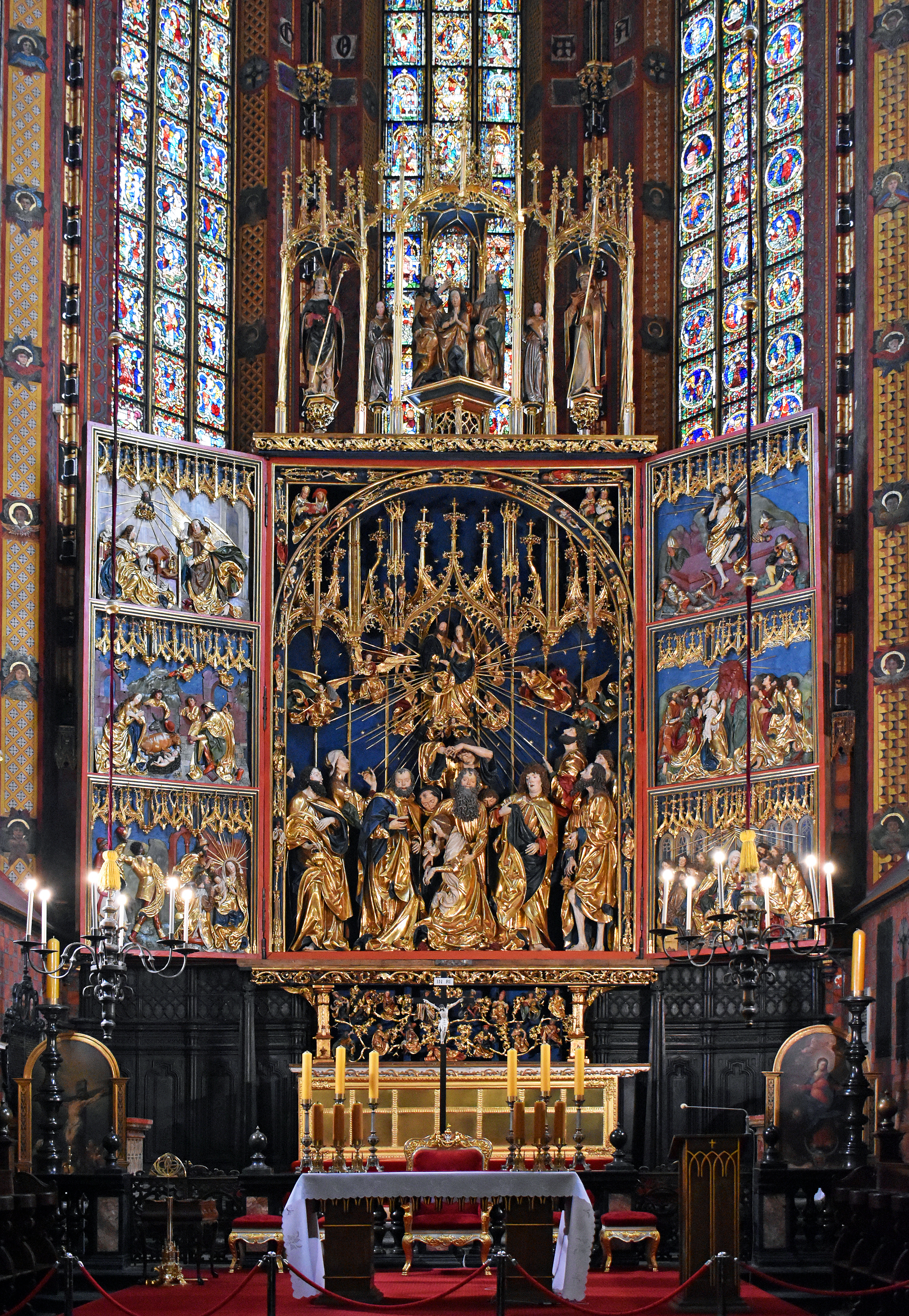
The altarpiece of Veit Stoss

The Altarpiece by Veit Stoss (Polish: Ołtarz Wita Stwosza), also St. Mary's Altar (Ołtarz Mariacki), is a large Gothic altarpiece and a national treasure of Poland. It is located behind the high altar of St. Mary's Basilica in the city of Kraków. The altarpiece was carved between 1477 and 1489 by the German-born sculptor Veit Stoss (known in Polish as Wit Stwosz) who lived and worked in the city for over 20 years.

In 1941, during the German occupation, the dismantled altarpiece was shipped to the Third Reich on the order of Hans Frank – the Governor-General of that part of occupied Poland. It was recovered in 1946 in Bavaria, hidden in the basement of the heavily bombed Nuremberg Castle. The High Altar underwent major restoration work in Poland and was put back in its place at the Basilica 10 years later.

== History ==
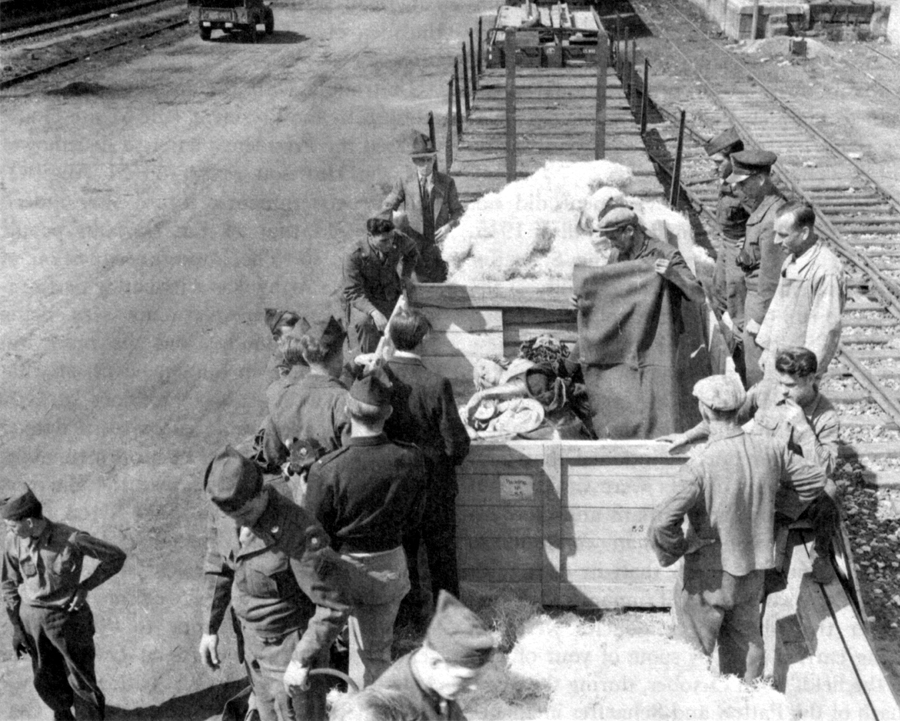
April 1946: German workmen and U.S. GI guards in Bavaria get a last look at the main figurehead from the altarpiece

=== World War II ===
A few weeks prior to the outbreak of the Second World War and the German occupation of Poland, the Poles took the altarpiece apart and stored its main statues in crates dispersed across the country. The crates were located by a Nazi unit called the Sonderkommando Paulsen, plundered and transported to the Third Reich, likely to Berlin. The panels were also found and sent to Germany. They were put in the basement of the Nuremberg Castle. At the castle, Polish prisoners sent messages to members of the Polish resistance that the revered altarpiece was hidden there. The altarpiece survived the war in spite of heavy bombardment of Nuremberg, and was discovered by Count Emeryk August Hutten-Czapski, who was attached to the Polish 1st Armoured Division, and it was returned to Poland in 1946, where it underwent major restoration. It was put back at St. Mary's Basilica in 1957. (Note: Veit Stoss, born a Nuremberger, met the Nazis' definition of "Aryan", and the German administration considered his altarpiece to be German property.)

The altarpiece was restored several times in its history, not only after the end of World War II. For the first time, it was renovated before 1600, then in 1866–1870, 1932–1933, 1946–1949, 1999 and finally, in 2017.

St. John Cantius in Chicago, a historic church in the 'Polish Cathedral' style contains a detailed copy of this masterpiece. This one-third scale copy is the largest and most detailed work of its kind, and was commissioned in 2003 as a tribute to the immigrants from the former Galicia region of southeastern Poland who founded the parish in 1893.

== Description ==
The Veit Stoss Altarpiece is about 13 m high and 11 m wide when the panels of the triptych are completely opened. The realistically sculptured figures are 2.7 m (more than 12 ft.) high; each one was carved out of a tree trunk of lime (linden). Other parts of the altarpiece are made from oak wood, and the background is constructed of larch wood. When closed, the panels show 12 scenes of the life of Jesus and Mary.

The scene at the bottom of the main altarpiece (centre) shows the Dormition of Jesus' mother, Mary, in the presence of the Twelve Apostles. The upper centre part illustrates the Assumption of the Madonna. At the very top, outside the main frame, the coronation of Mary is shown, flanked by figures of Saint Stanislaus and Saint Adalbert of Prague. The side panels show the six scenes of the Joys of Mary:

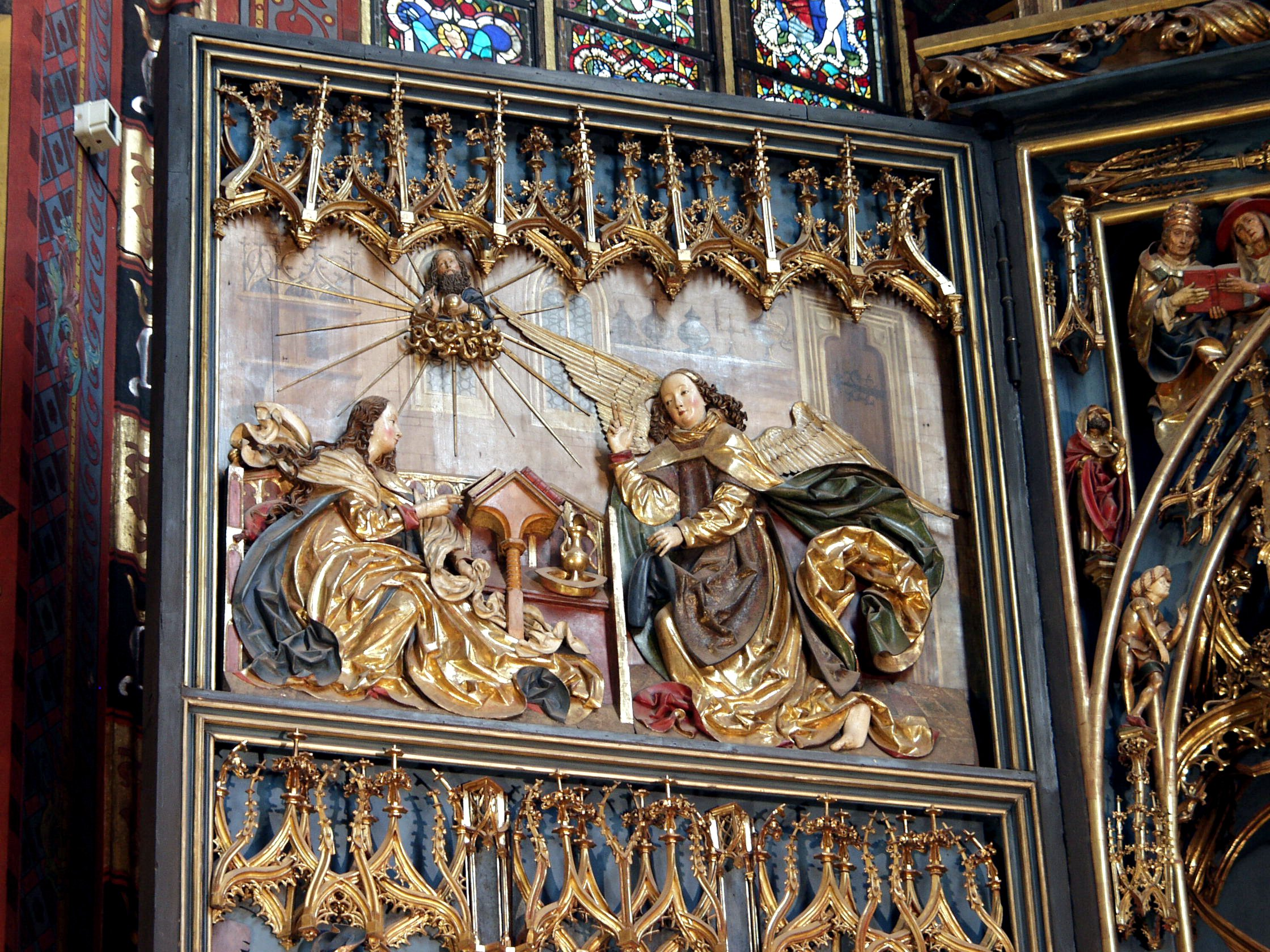
Annunciation

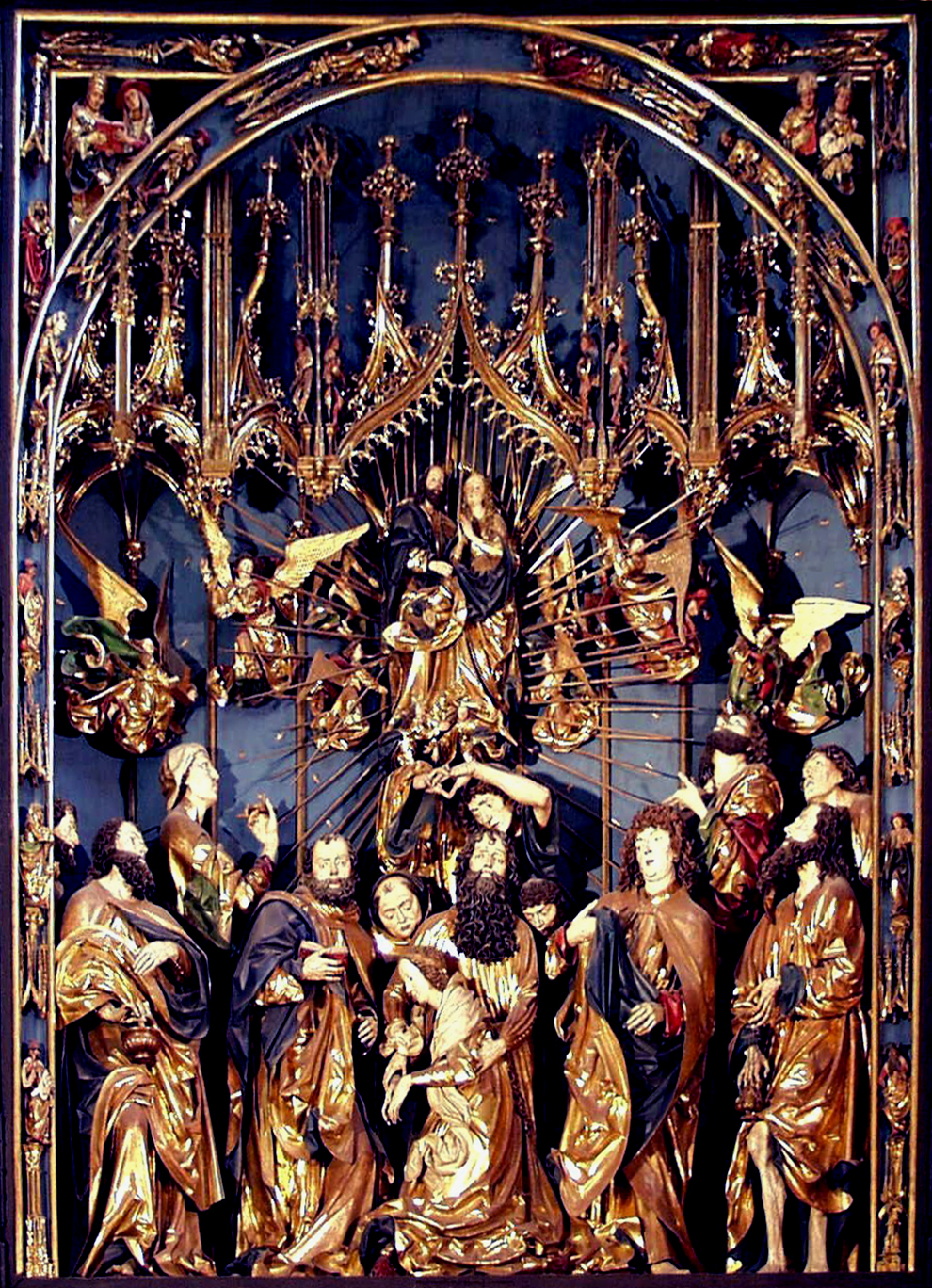
Centre scene, the Dormition of Mary; Mother of Jesus, in the presence of the Twelve Apostles

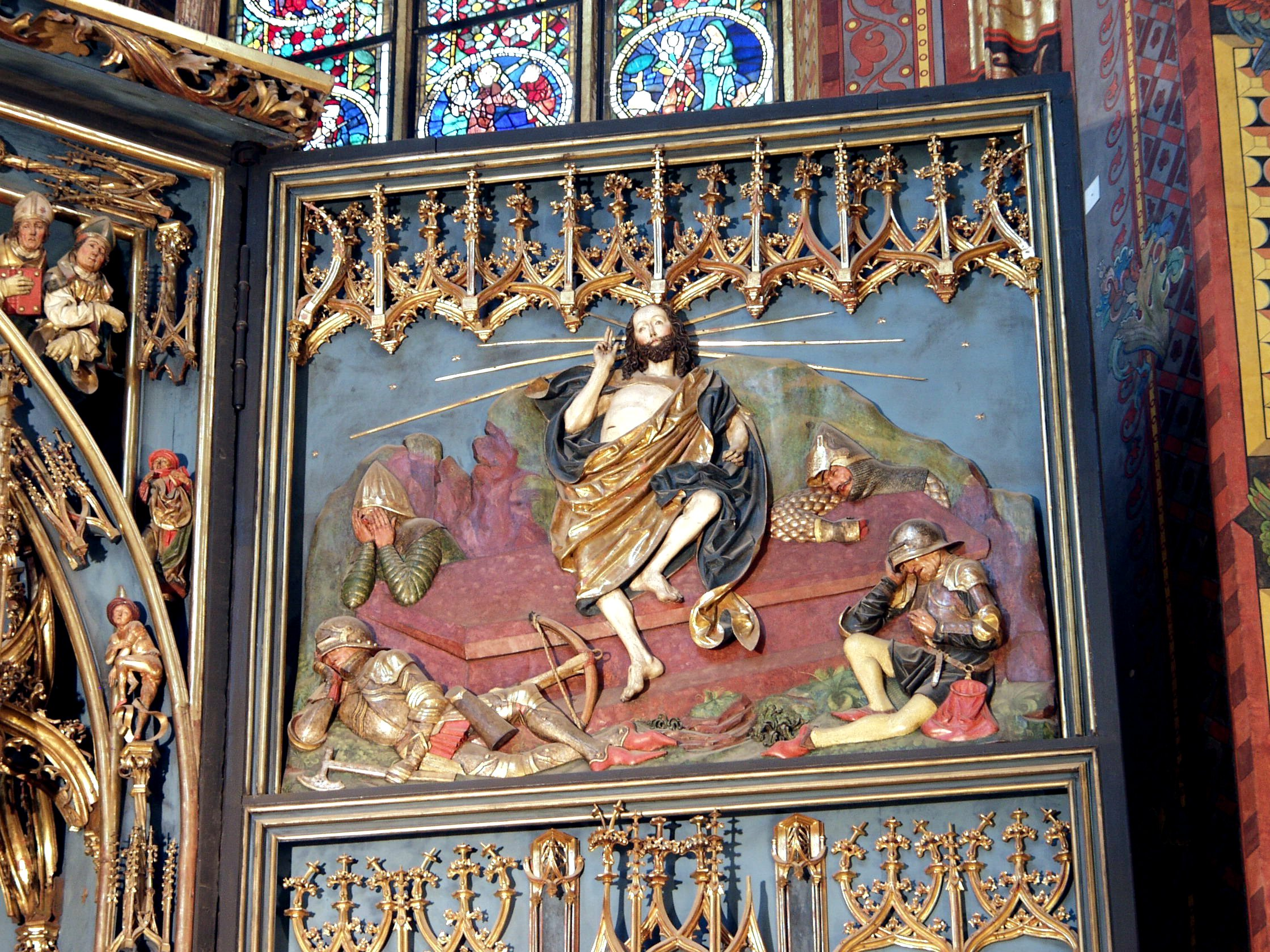
Resurrection of Christ

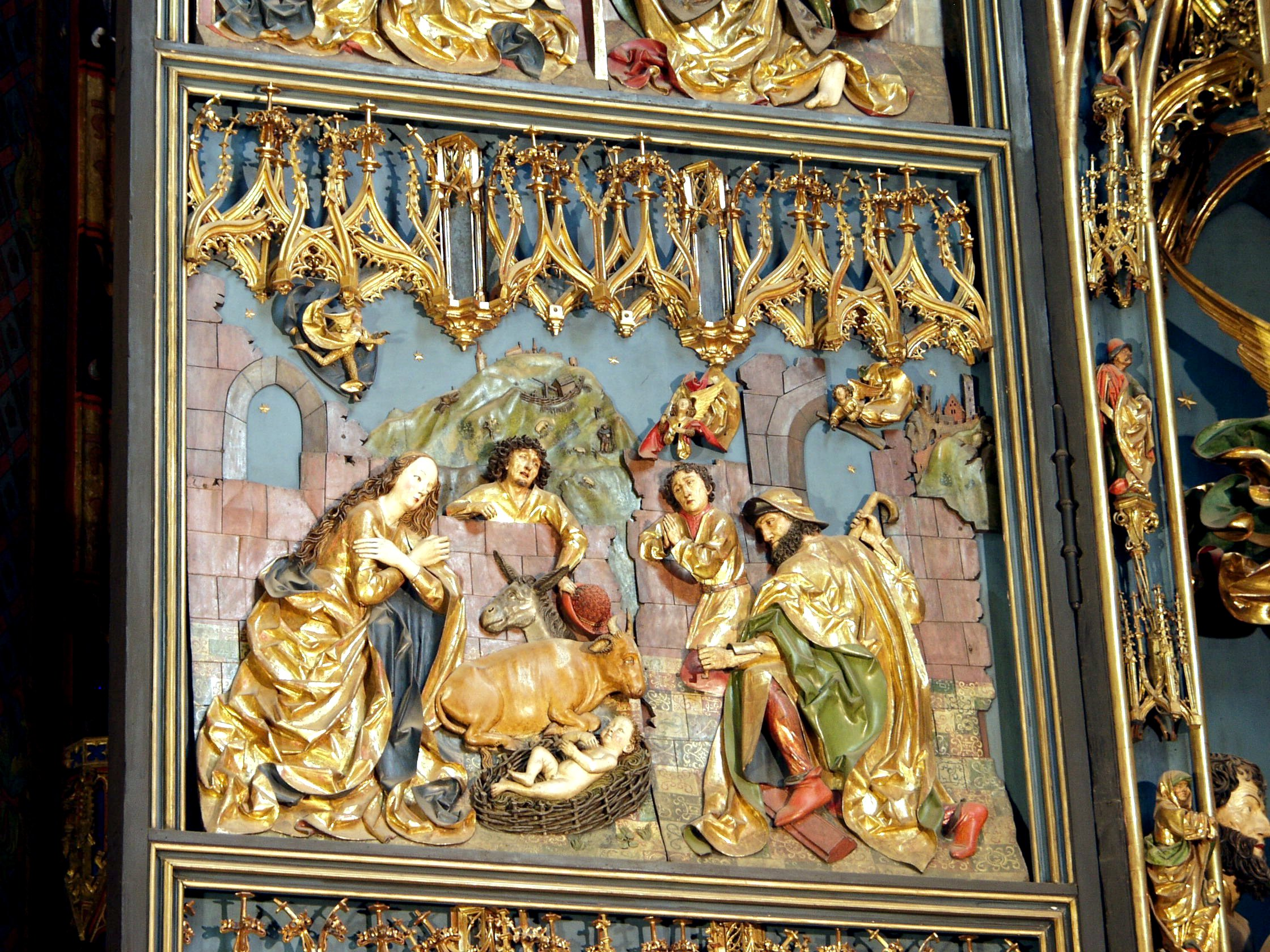
Nativity scene

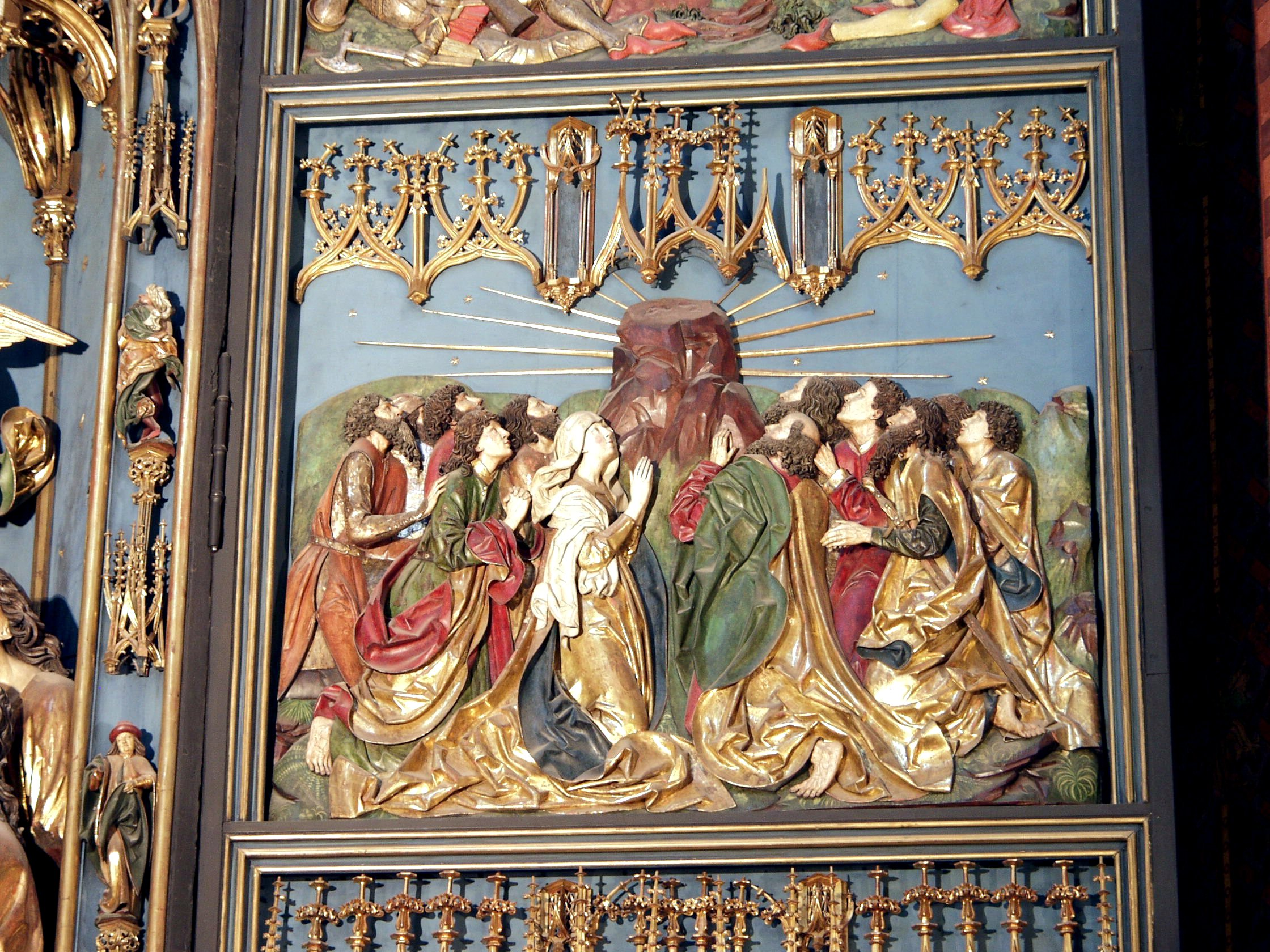
Ascension of Christ

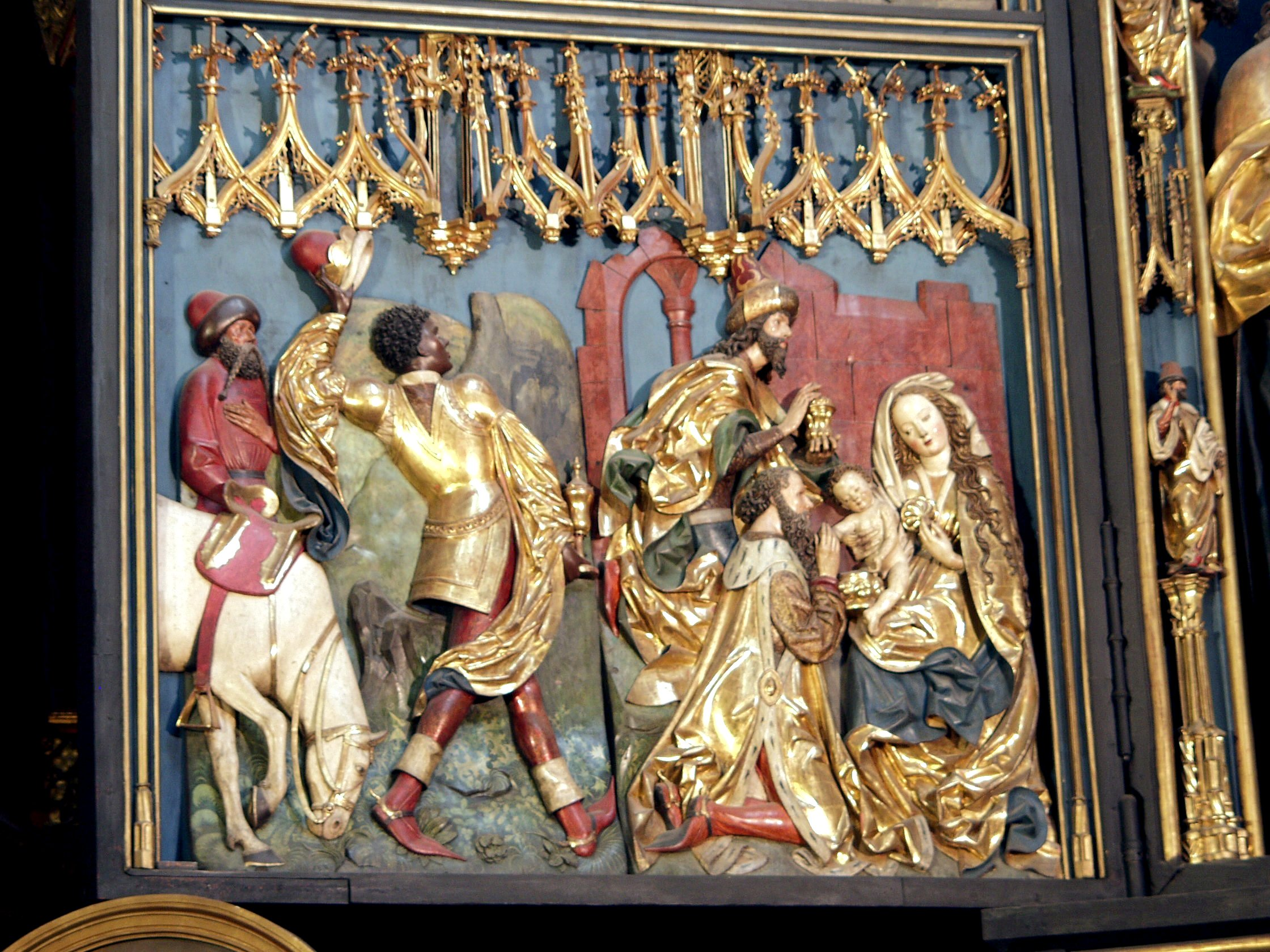
Three Wise Men

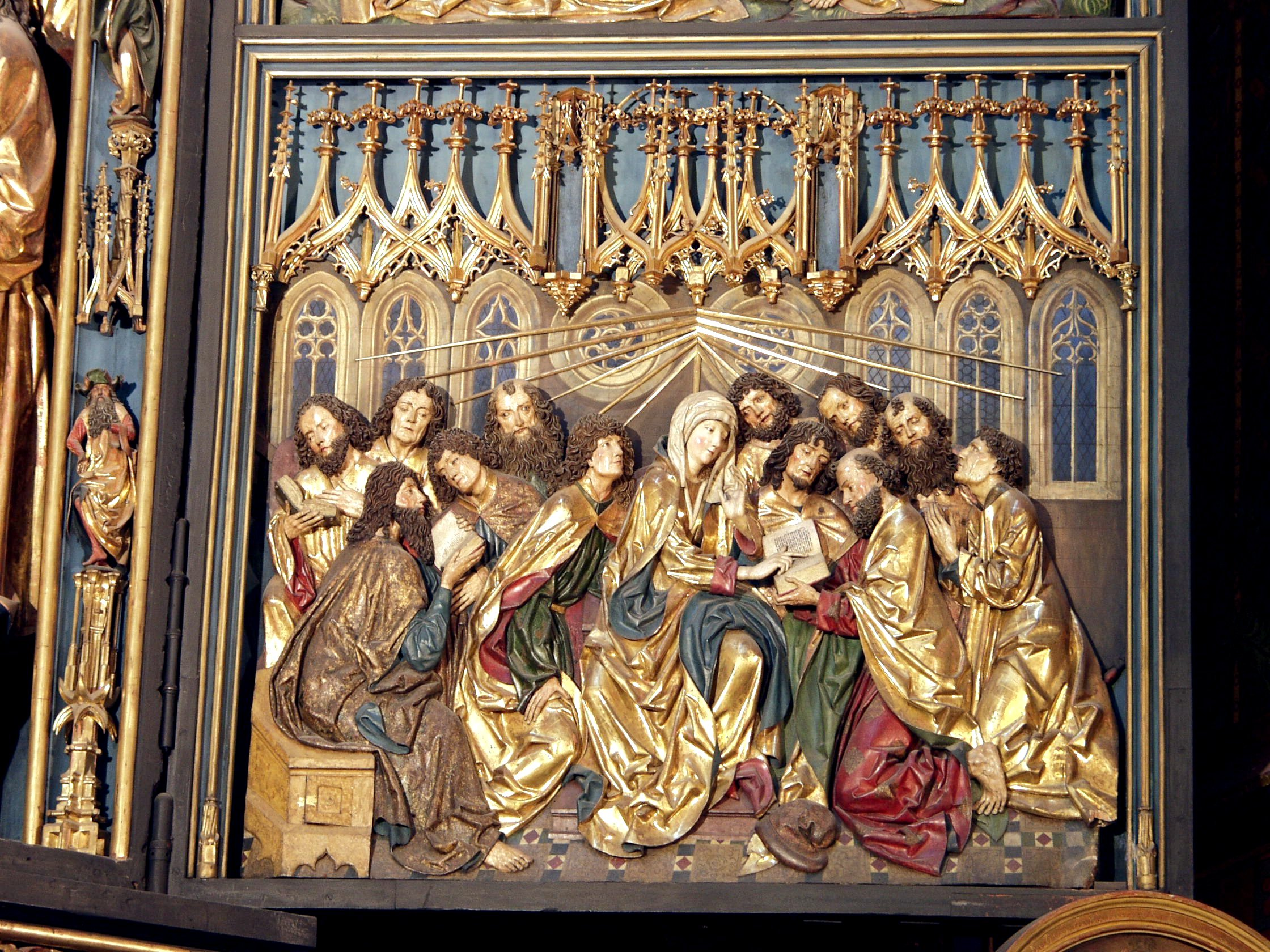
Descent of the Holy Spirit

== Photographs ==
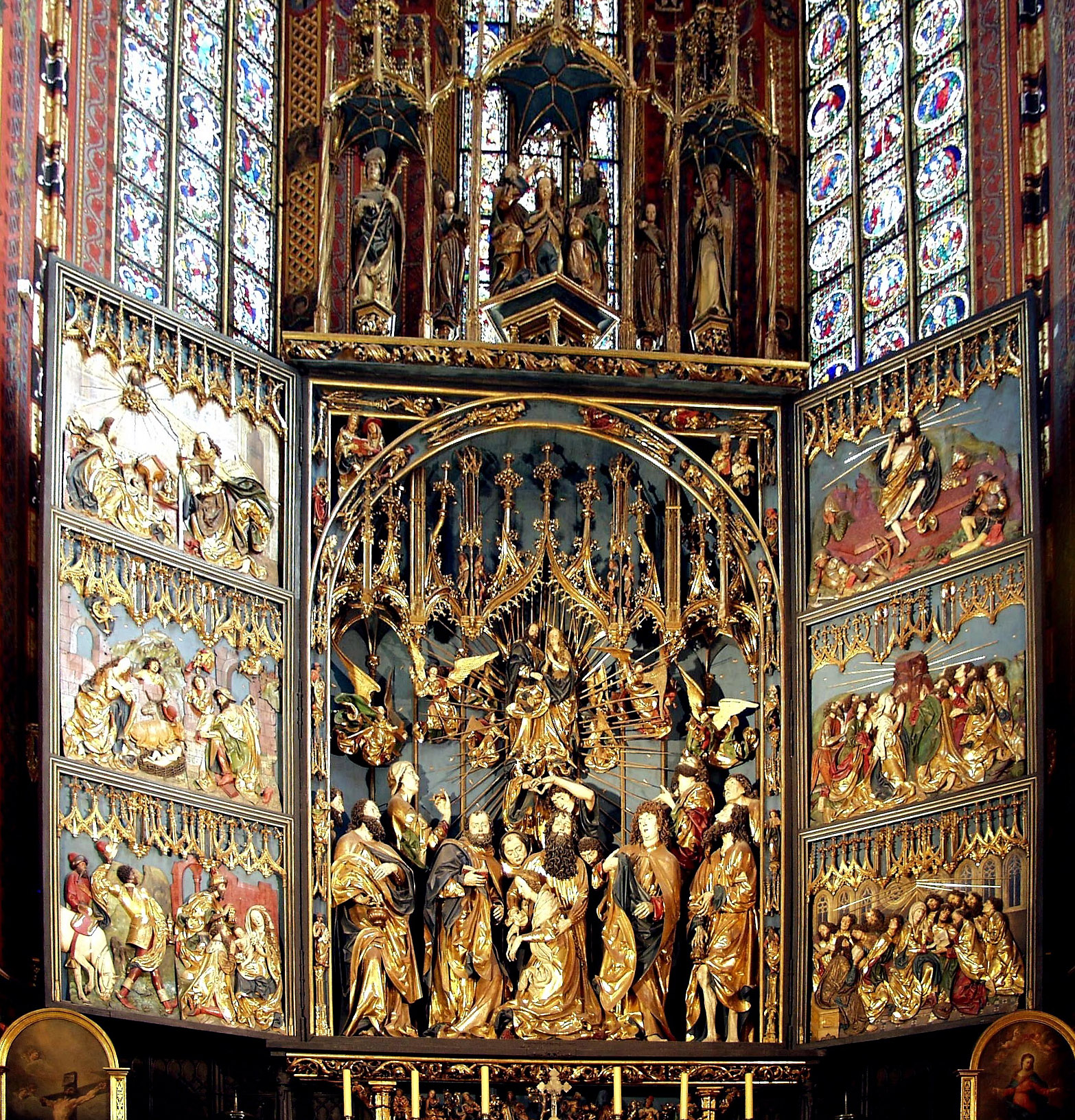
Overview

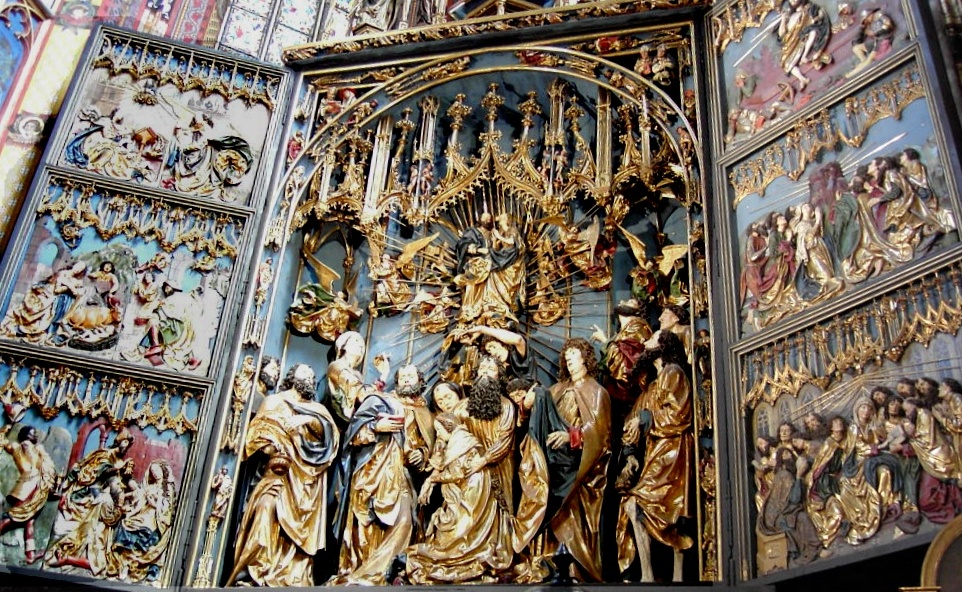
Centre of the altarpiece

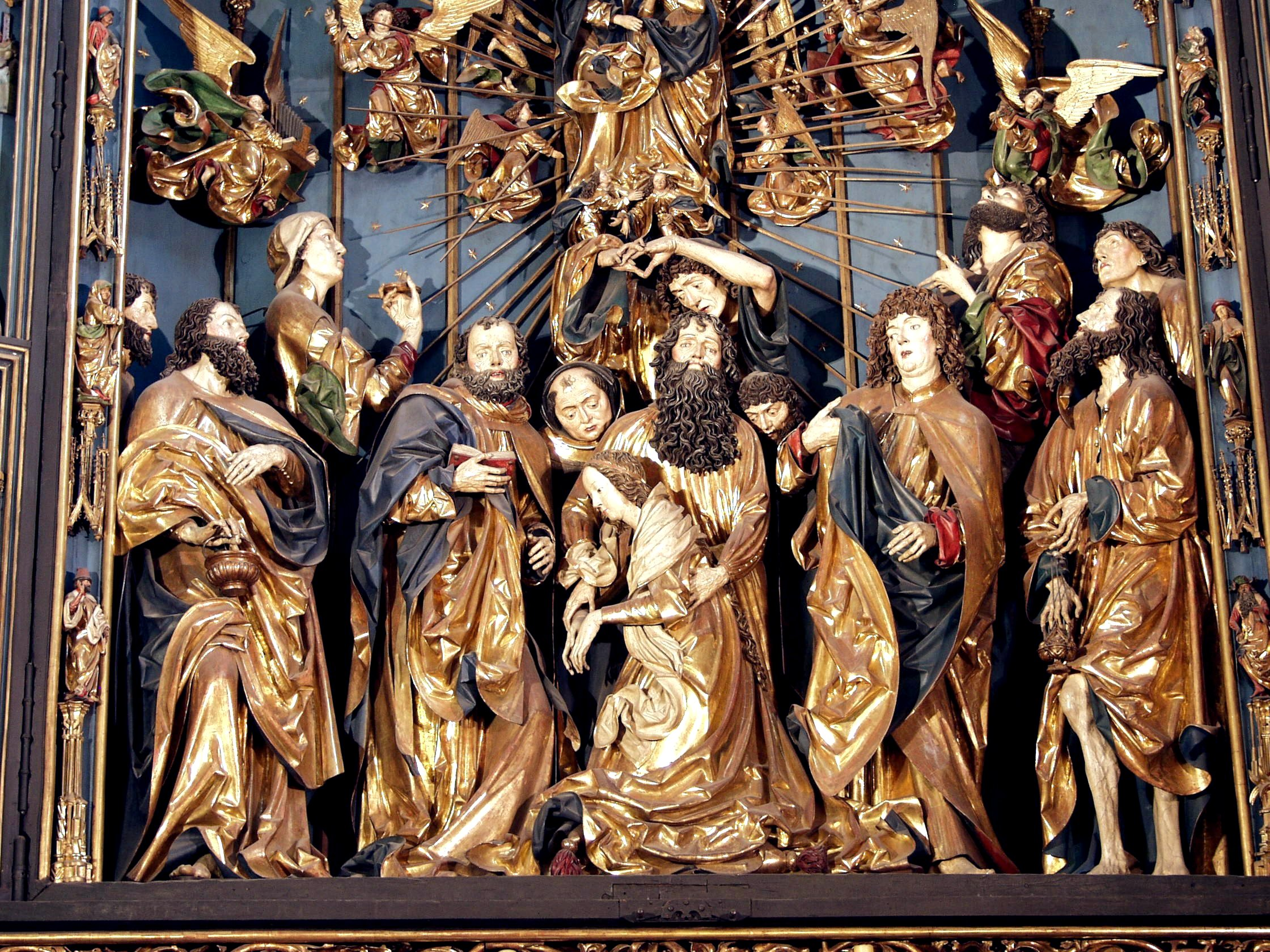
Dormition of Mary

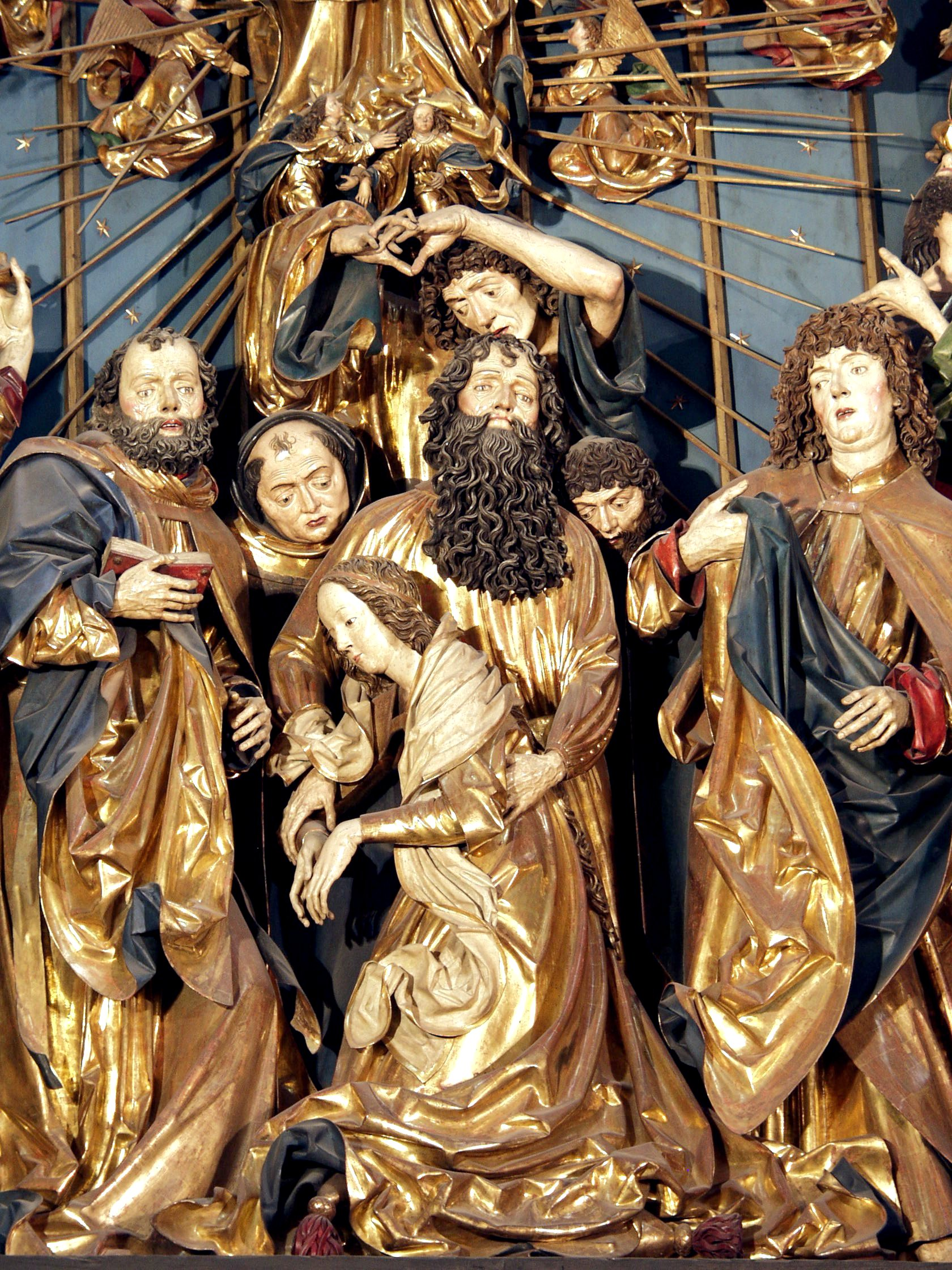
Dormition of Mary, detail

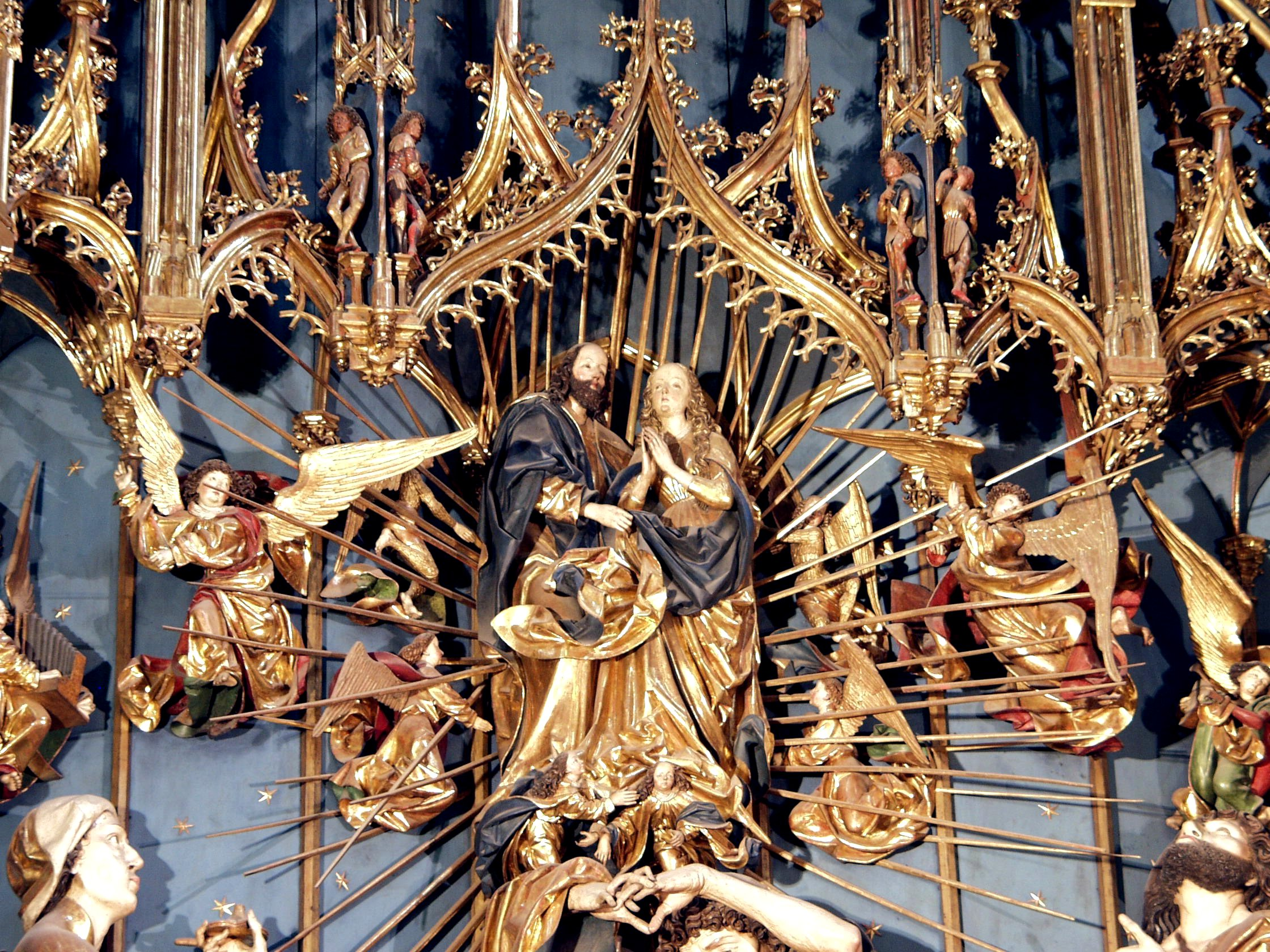
Assumption of Mary

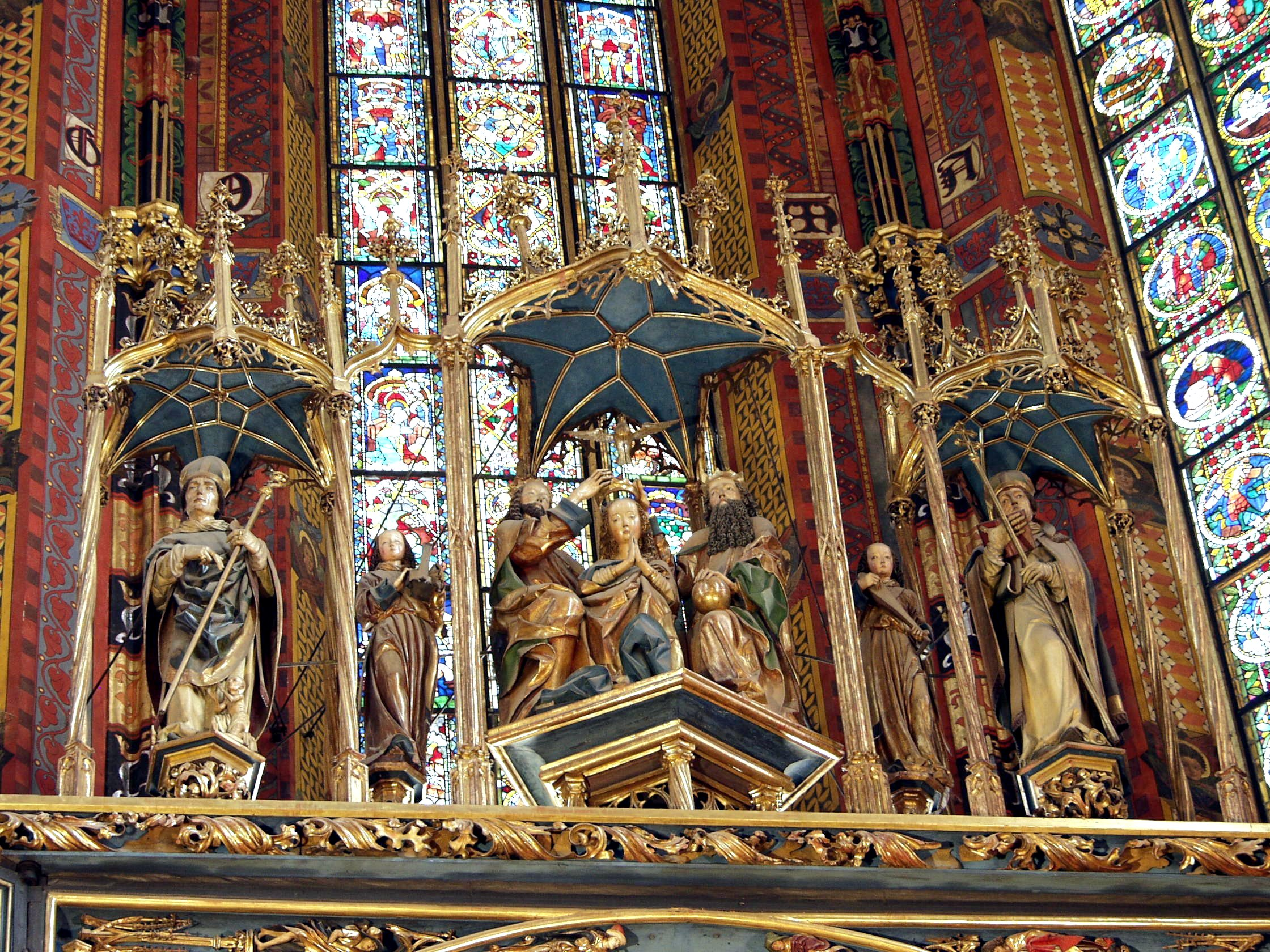
Coronation of Mary, with St. Stanislaus and St. Adalbert

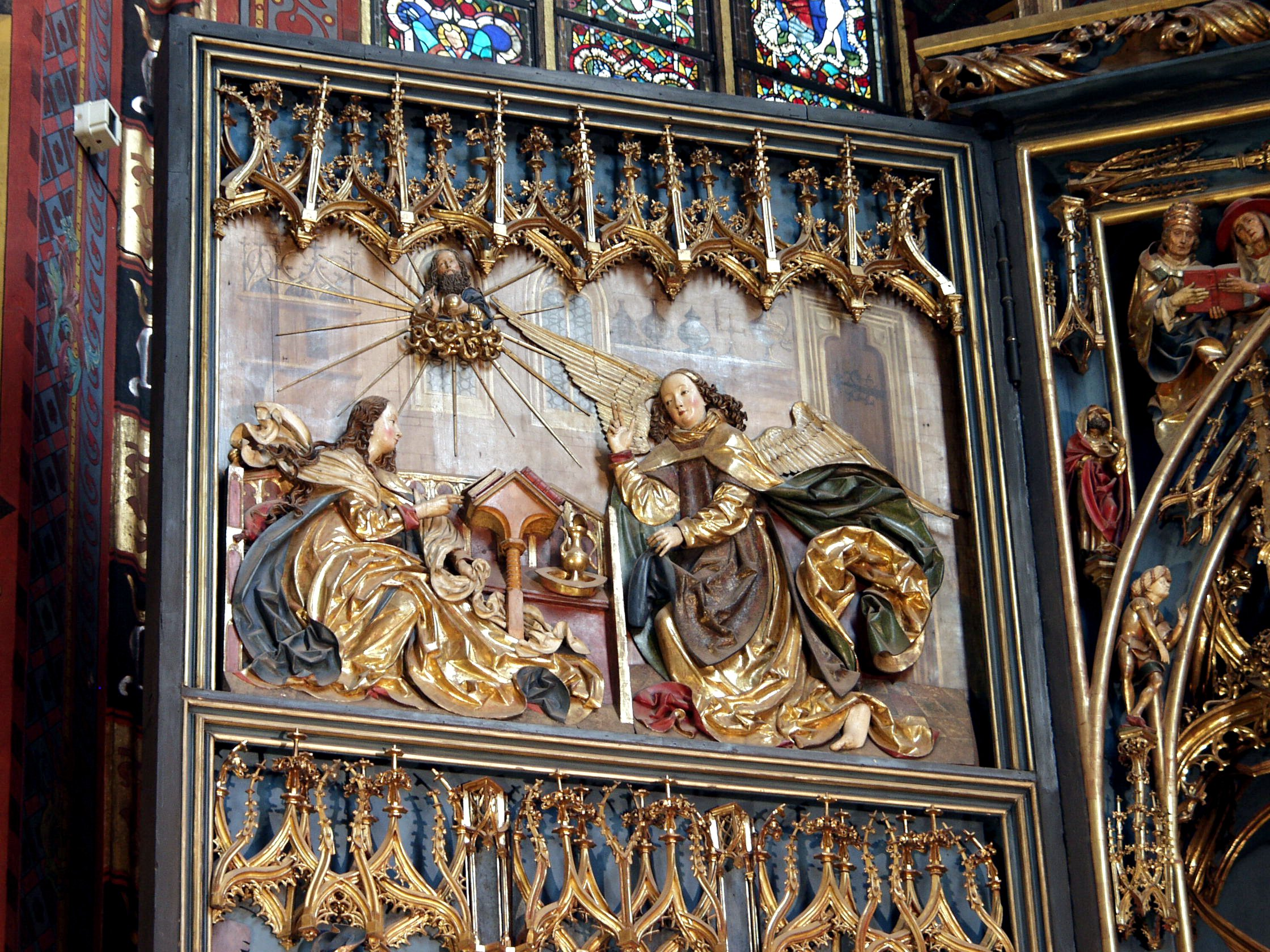
Annunciation

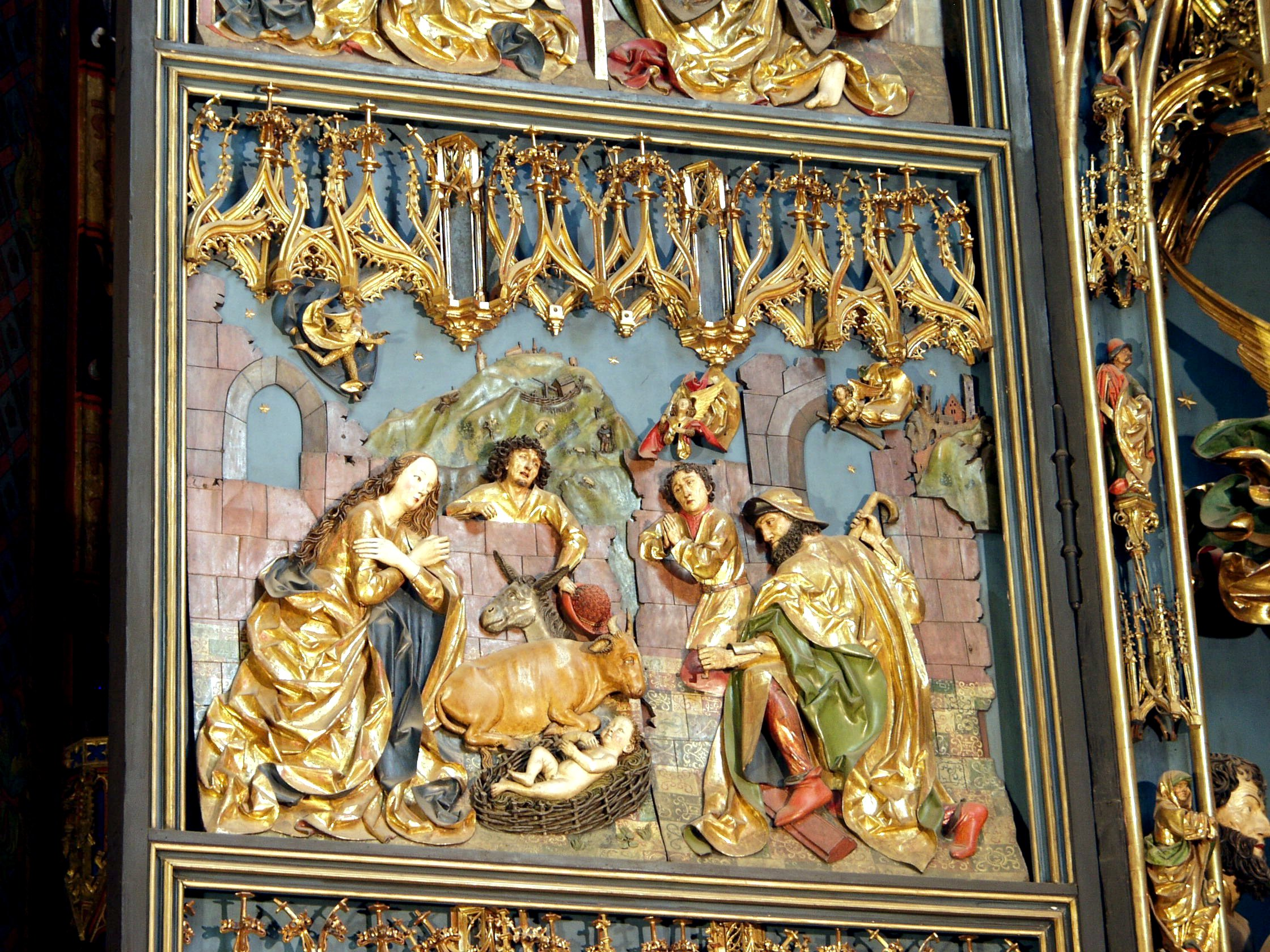
Nativity scene

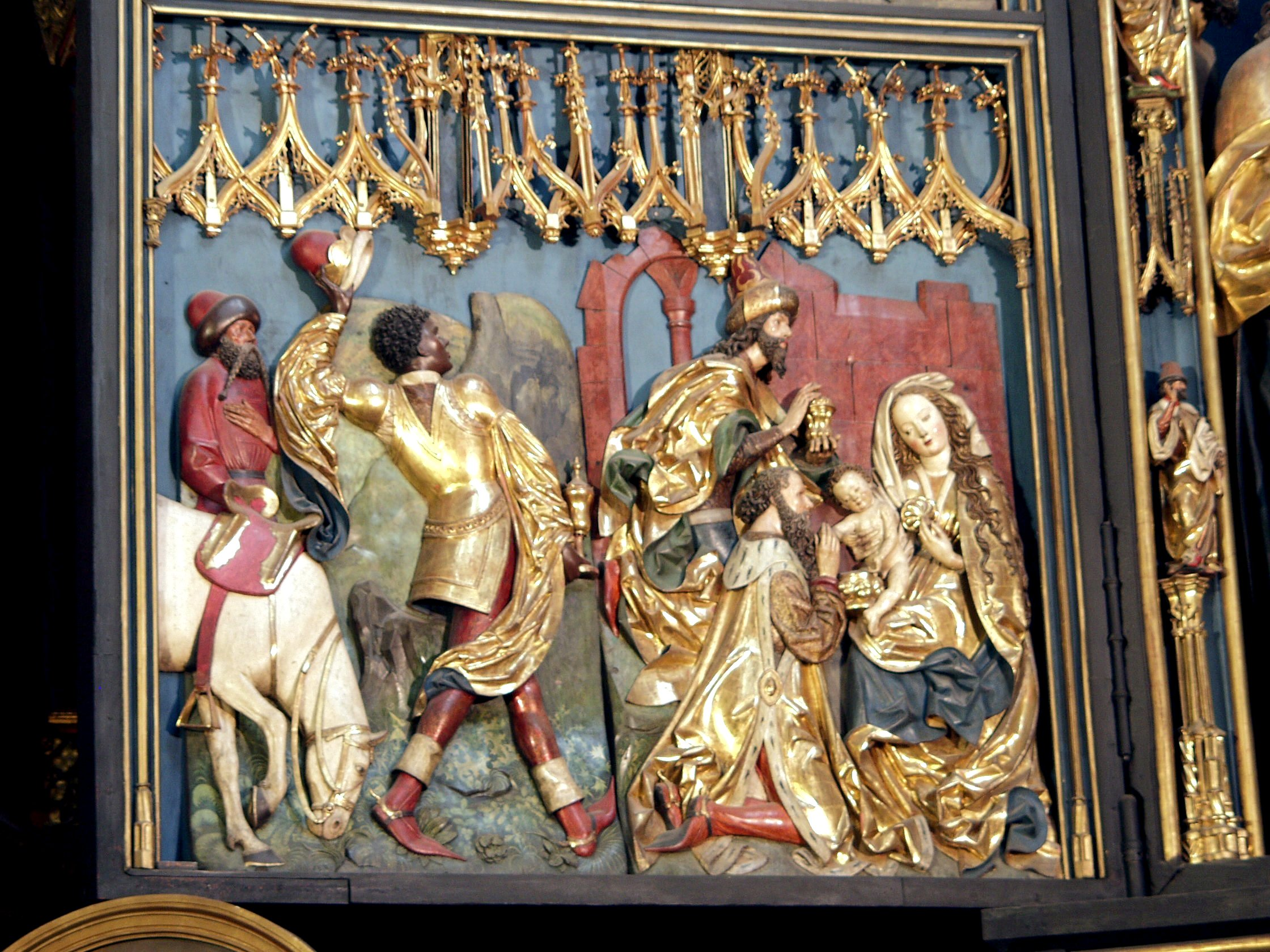
Three Wise Men

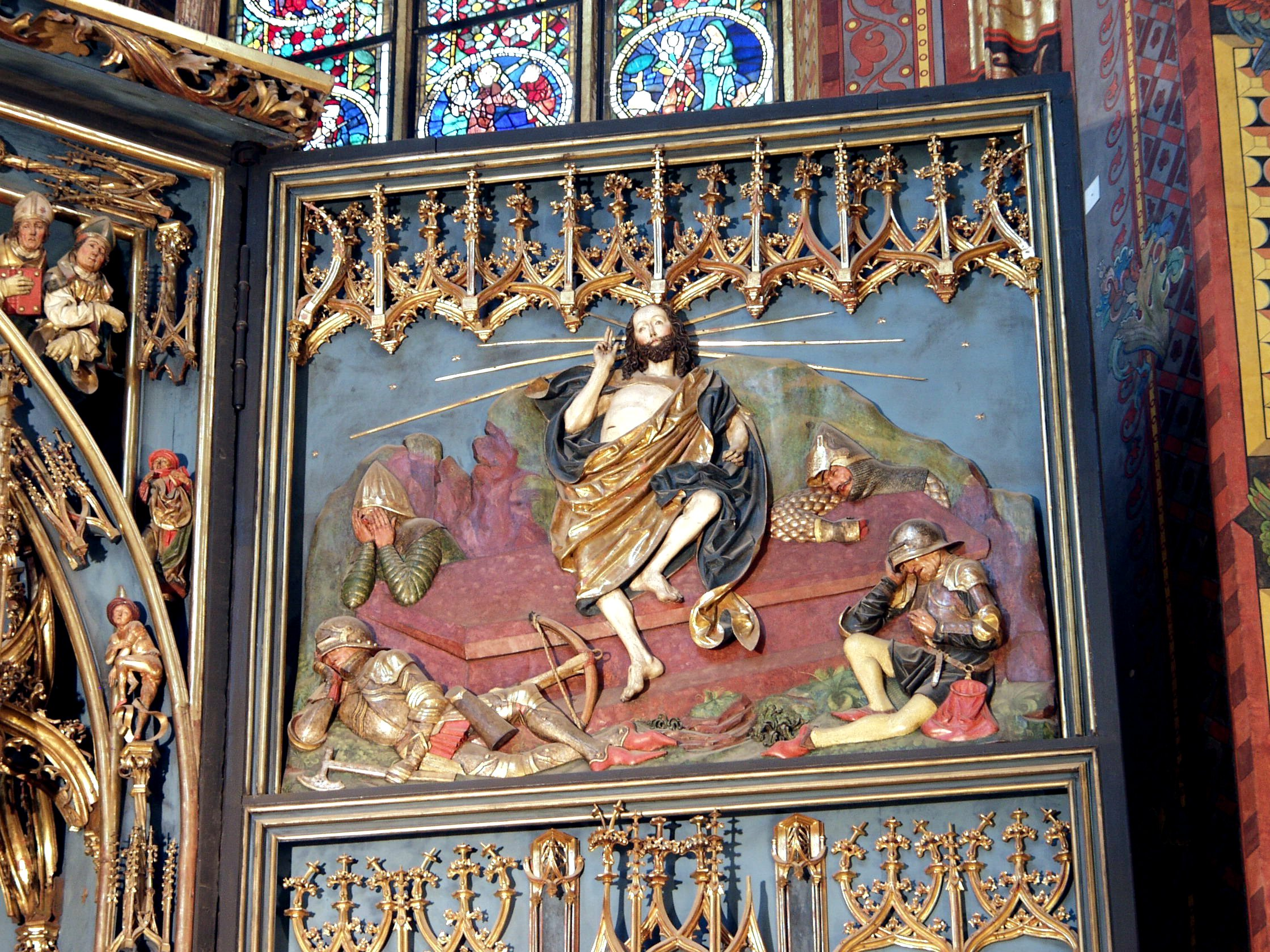
Resurrection of Christ

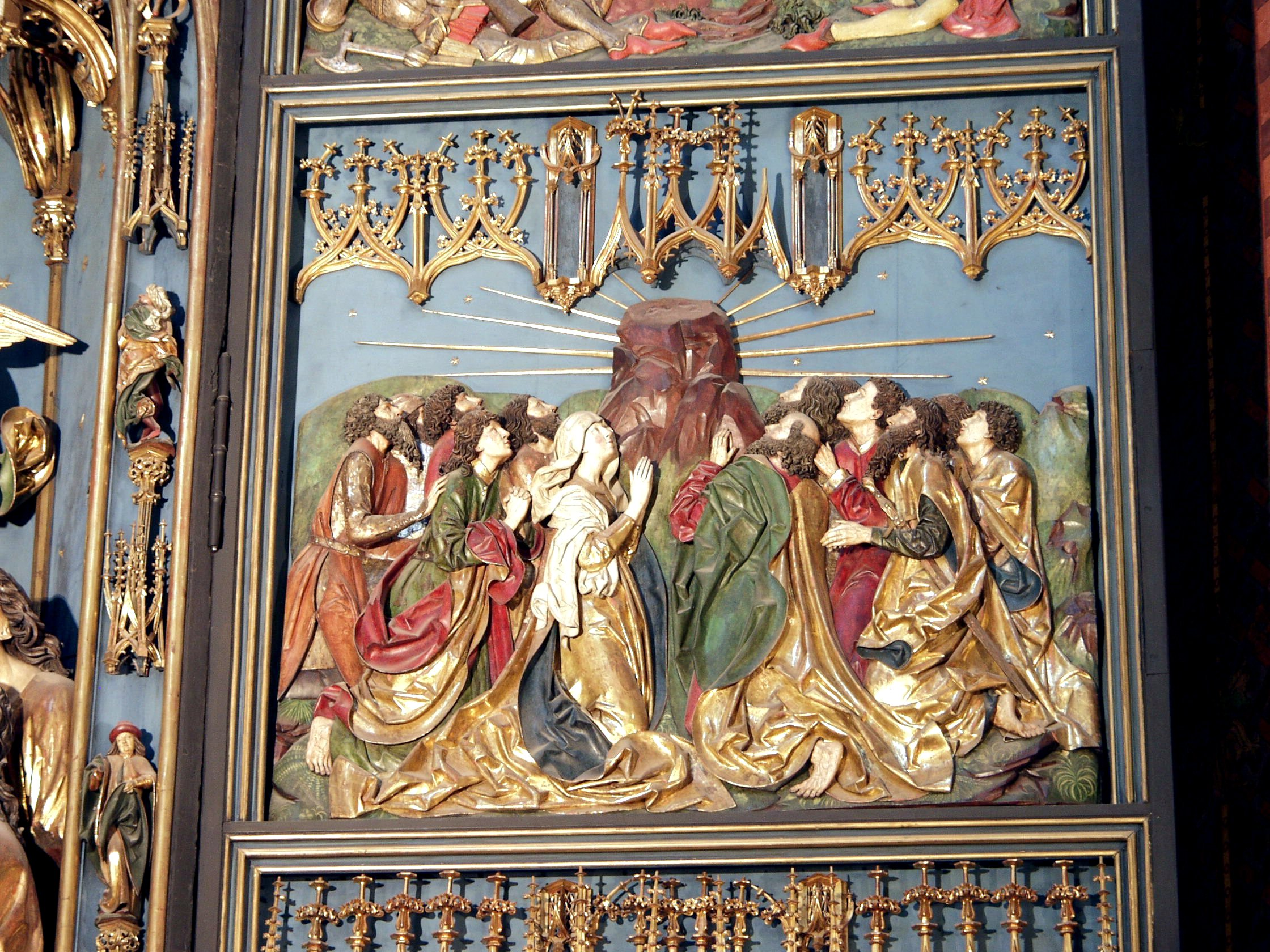
Ascension of Christ

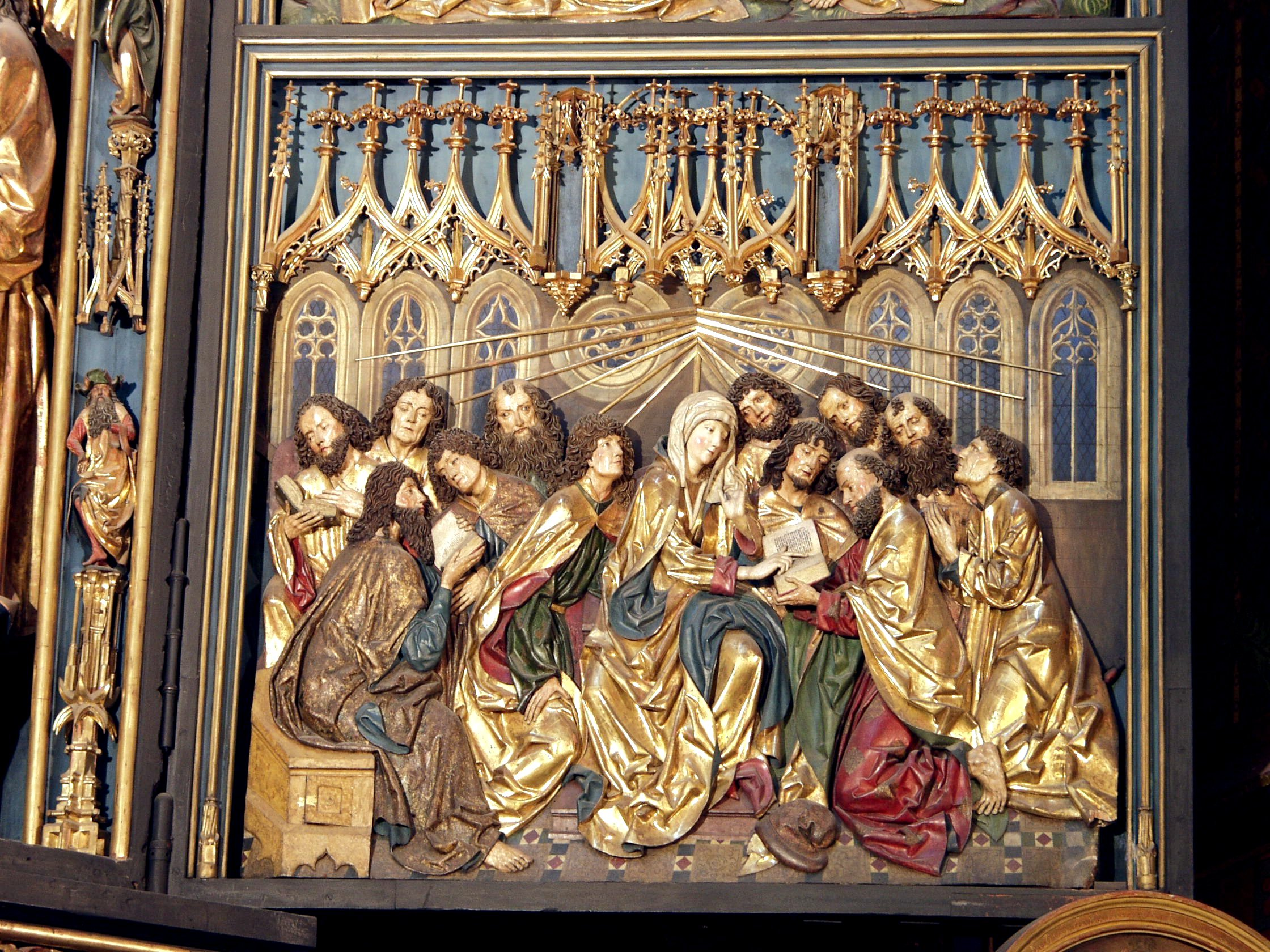
Descent of the Holy Spirit

== After 2021 restoration ==
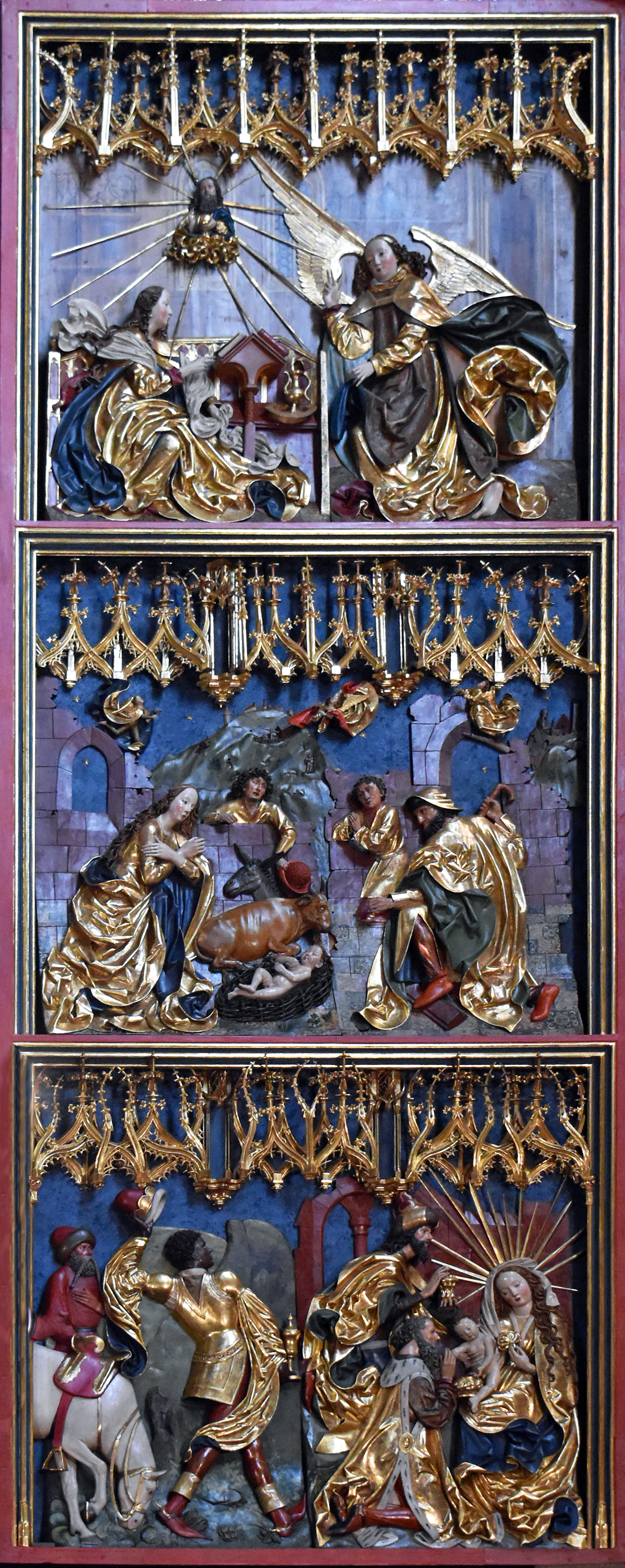
Left wing

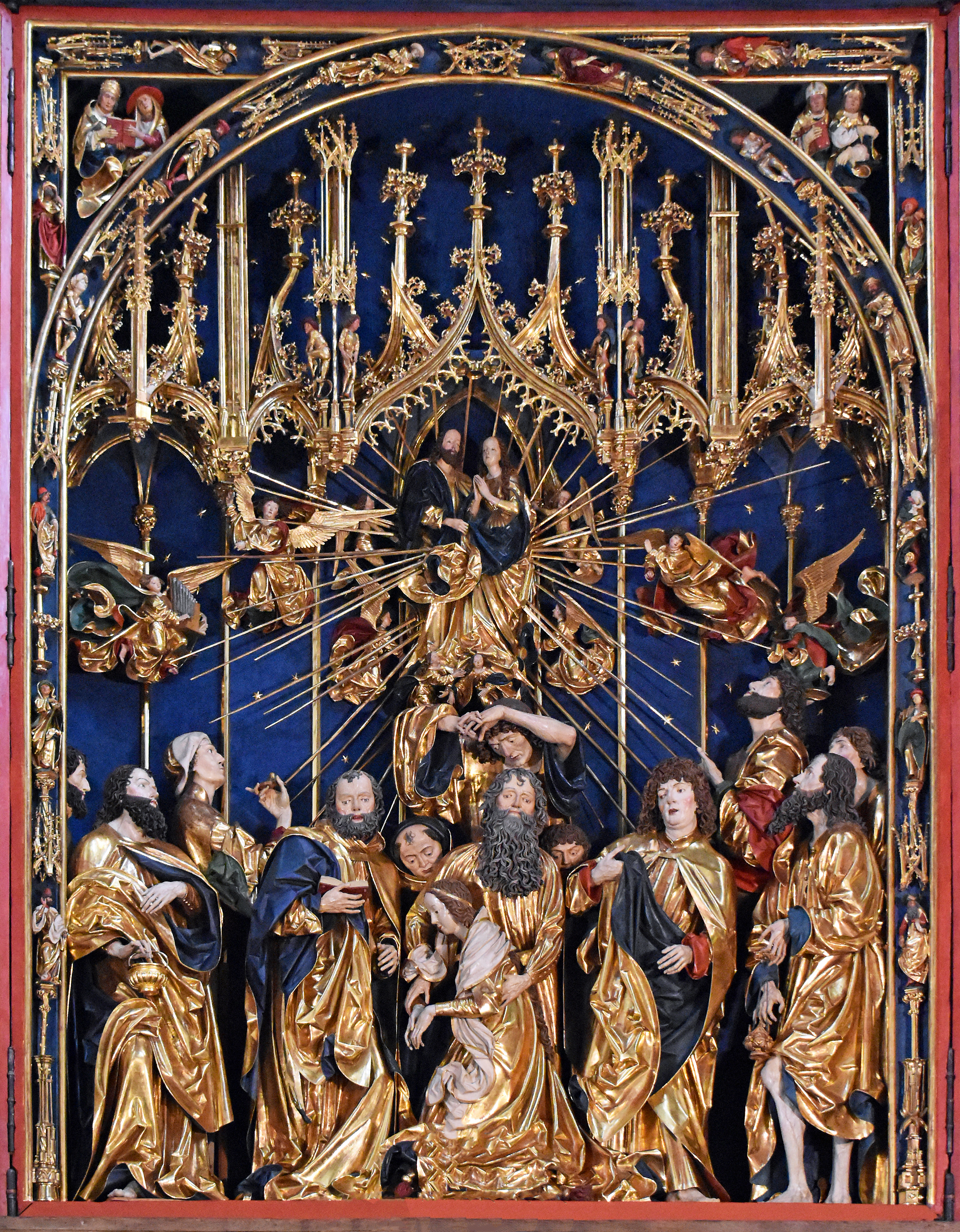
Centre of the altarpiece

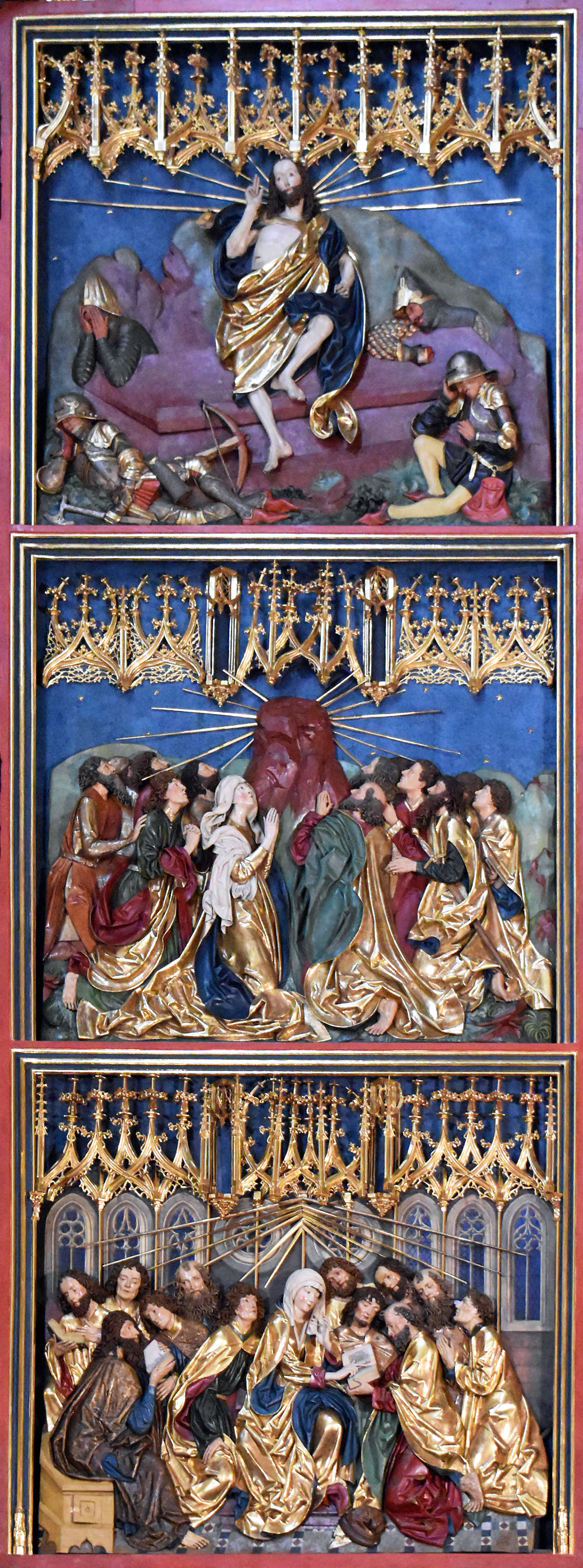
Right wing
