= Kraków Peninsula =

Peninsula in Antarctica

Kraków Peninsula (62°7′S 58°15′W) is the peninsula between Admiralty Bay and King George Bay, King George Island, in the South Shetland Islands. The name "Kraków Icefield," after Kraków, the former capital of Poland, was applied in 1980 by the Polish Antarctic Expedition to the ice that nearly covers this peninsula. The original name was amended soon after so as to apply to the peninsula.
