= Veit Stoss =

German sculptor (1447–1533)

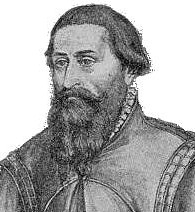
- Born: Before 1450; Horb am Neckar, Further Austria, Holy Roman Empire
- Died: 20 September 1533 (aged 83 or older); Nuremberg, Free Imperial City of Nuremberg, Holy Roman Empire
- Resting place: St. Johannis Cemetery, Nuremberg
- Known for: Sculpture
- Movement: Late Gothic, Northern Renaissance

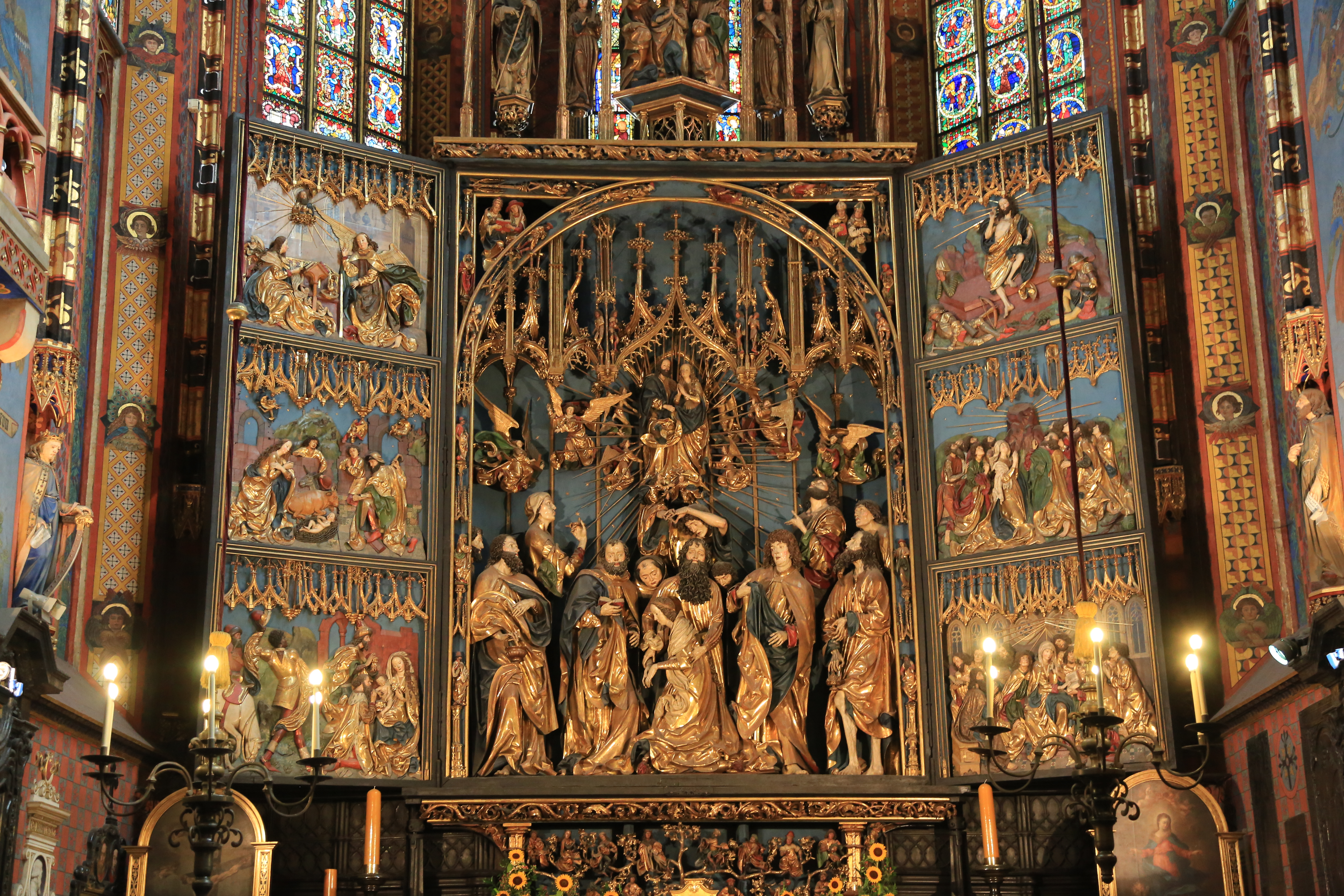
Wooden Altar of Veit Stoss at St Mary's Church in Kraków

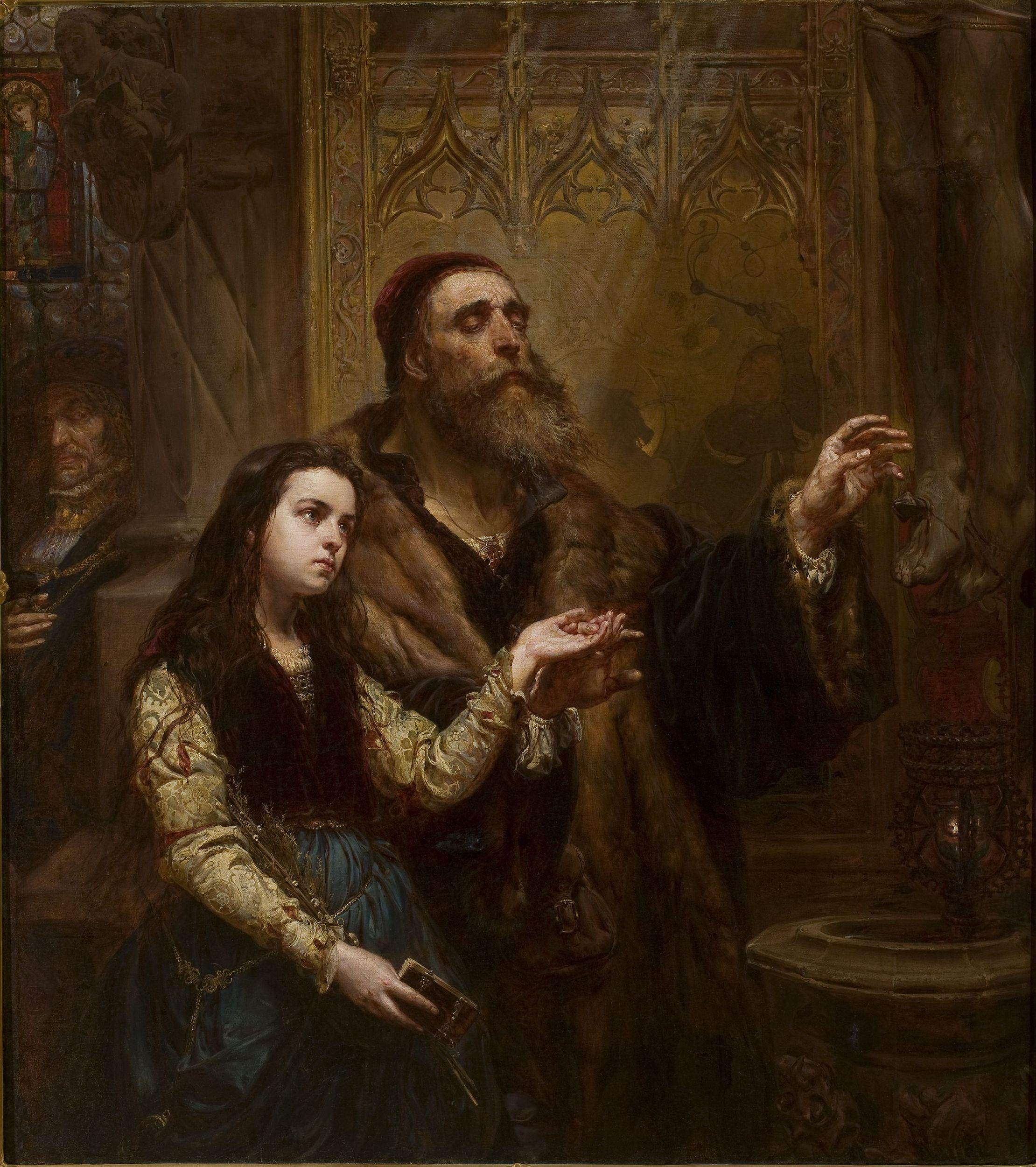
Blind Veit Stoss with granddaughter by Jan Matejko (1865), National Museum in Warsaw

Veit Stoss (German: [faɪt ˈʃtoːs], also spelled Stoß and Stuoss; Polish: Wit Stwosz; Latin: Vitus Stoss; before 1450 – about 20 September 1533) was a leading German sculptor, mostly working with wood, whose career covered the transition between the late Gothic and the Northern Renaissance. His style emphasized pathos and emotion, helped by his virtuoso carving of billowing drapery; it has been called "late Gothic Baroque". He had a large workshop, and in addition to his own works there are a number by pupils. He is best known for the altarpiece in St. Mary's Basilica in Kraków, Poland.

== Early life and marriage ==
According to the contracts and other official documents written in the fifteenth and sixteenth centuries, Stoss was born in a place pronounced as Horb or Horbn. Most researchers identify this place with Horb am Neckar near Stuttgart in Germany. However, there are artistic traces indicating that Stoss's early education could have taken place in the modern Switzerland. Moreover, his brother was certainly born in Aarau in northern Switzerland, which suggests that the artist's family lived in the region and that Stoss was rather born in the town of Horben, located 30 km southeast of Aarau His exact date of birth is unknown though it must have been shortly before 1450. Nothing about his life is known for certain before 1473 when he moved to Nuremberg in Franconia and married Barbara Hertz. Their eldest son Andreas was born there before 1477, when Stoss moved to Kraków, the royal capital of Poland, where he was commissioned to produce the enormous polychrome wooden Altar of Veit Stoss (Ołtarz Wita Stwosza) at St Mary's Church in Kraków. His son Stanisław who was born in Kraków the next year was also a sculptor.

== In Kraków (1477–1496) ==
Veit lived and worked in Kraków for almost twenty years, from 1477–1496. His name is usually polonized as Wit Stwosz. The altar in Kraków was completed in 1489, and was the largest triptych of its time. Like Stoss' other large works, it required a large workshop including specialized painters and gilders. Other important works from Stoss' period in Poland were the tomb of Casimir IV in Wawel Cathedral, the marble tomb of Zbigniew Oleśnicki in Gniezno, and the altar of Saint Stanislaus. The Polish court was more aware of Italian styles than Nuremberg patrons of that time, and some of Stoss' Polish work used Renaissance classical ornament.

During World War II, on the order of Hans Frank – the Governor-General of that region of occupied Poland – the dismantled Altar was shipped to Nazi Germany around 1941. It was rediscovered in 1945 in Bavaria, hidden in the basement of the heavily bombed Nuremberg Castle. The High Altar underwent major restoration work in Poland and was put back in its place at the Basilica ten years later.

== In Nuremberg (1496-1533) ==
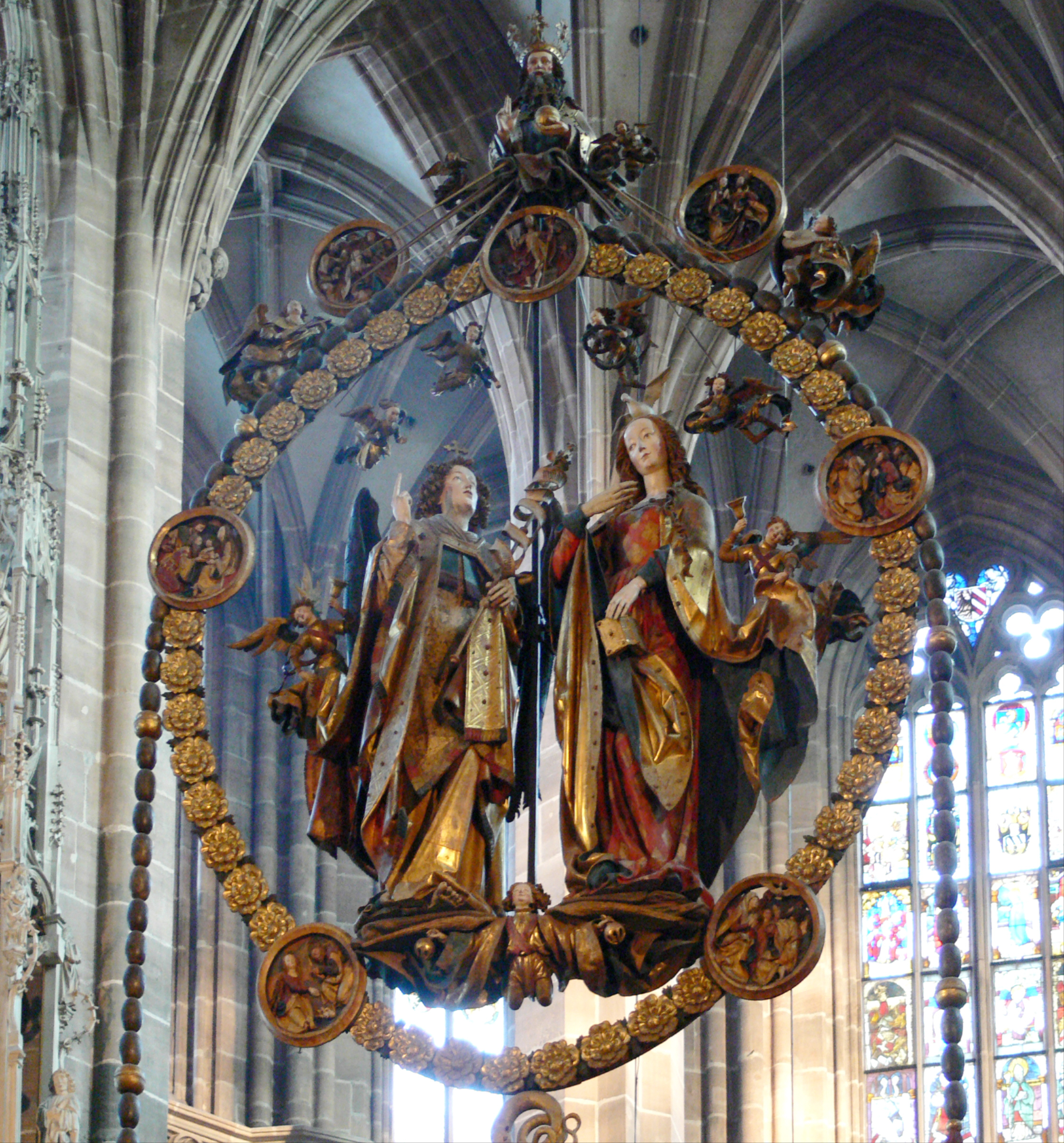
Angelic Salutation (1517–1518) in the St. Lorenz Kirche, Nuremberg

In 1496, Stoss returned to Nuremberg with his wife and eight children. He reacquired his citizenship for three gulden and resumed his work there as a sculptor. Between 1500 and 1503 he carved an altar, now lost, for the parish church of Schwaz, Tyrol of the "Assumption of Mary". In 1503, he was arrested for forging the seal and signature of a fraudulent contractor and was sentenced to be branded on both of his cheeks and prohibited from leaving Nuremberg without the explicit permission of the city council. He was pardoned in 1506 by Emperor Maximilian and his civil rights reinstated.

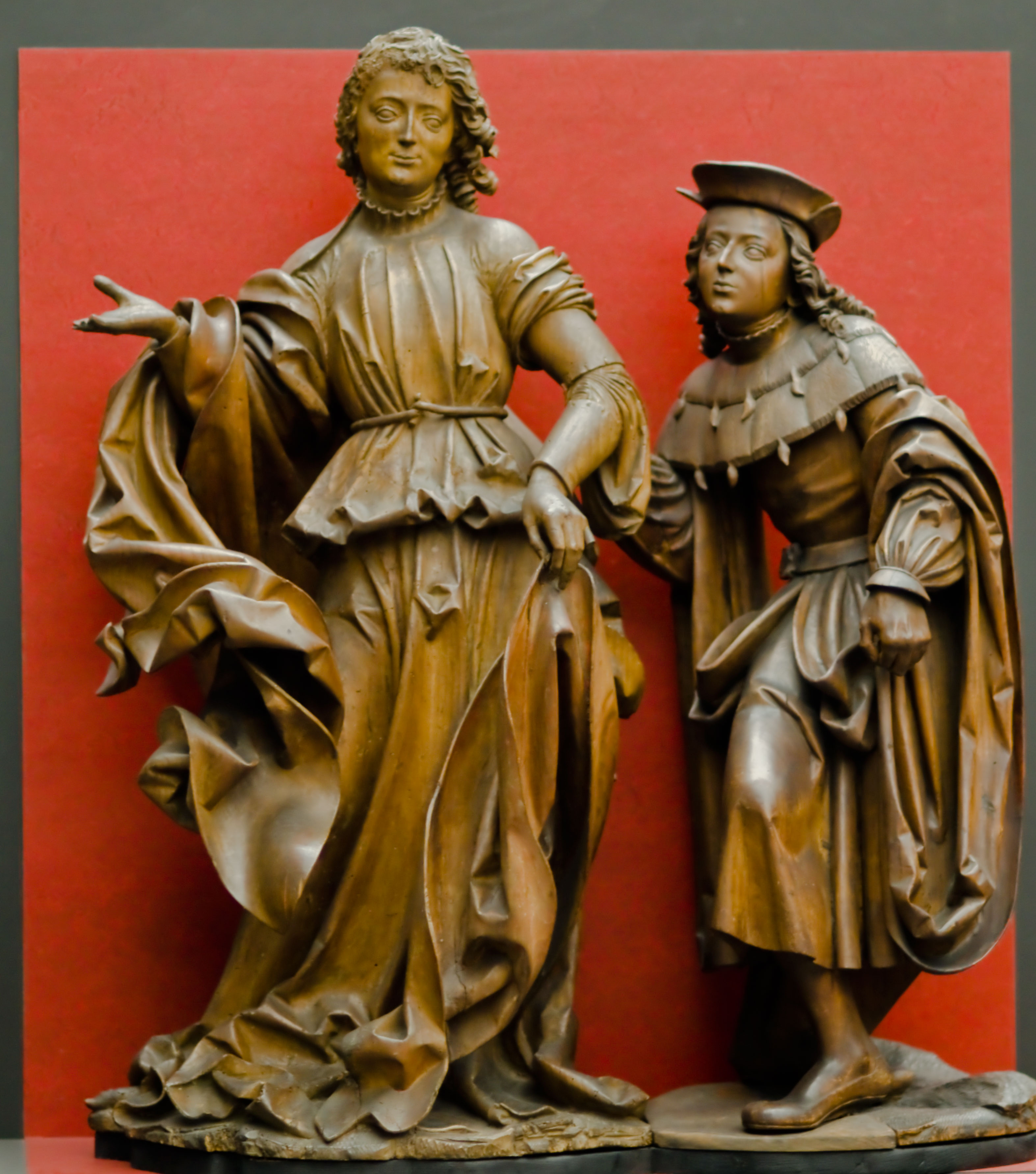
The Angel Raphael and the young Tobias. Limewood. 97 cm (38 in), (Germanisches Nationalmuseum, Nuremberg)

Despite the prohibition he went to Münnerstadt in 1504, to paint and gild the altarpiece that Tilman Riemenschneider had left in plain wood ten years earlier, presumably according to his contract (unlike Stoss, his workshop did not include painters and gilders). Leaving wood sculpture unpainted was a new taste at the time, and "perhaps the tastes of the city council were somewhat provincial." He also created the altar for Bamberg Cathedral and various other sculptures in Nuremberg, including the Annunciation and Tobias and the Angel. In 1506 he was arrested a second time. In 1507, Emperor Maximilian wrote a letter of pardon. The sole argument was made on the account of his genius. The council of the Imperial free city Nuremberg refused to give him a public notice. But Maximilian's intervention saved him from the dungeons and having his hands chopped off. He was able to resettle in Nuremberg from 1506, but was shunned by the council and received few large commissions from that time onwards. In 1512, the Emperor asked Stoss to help with the planning of his tomb monument, which was eventually placed in the Hofkirche, Innsbruck; it seems Stoss's attempts to cast in brass were unsuccessful.

During the period 1515–1520, Veit Stoss received a commission for sculptures by Raffaele Torrigiani, a rich Florentine merchant. In 1516 he made Tobias and the Angel (now in Germanisches Nationalmuseum, Nuremberg), and a statue of Saint Roch for the Basilica of Santissima Annunziata in Florence. This wooden statue represents the saint in a traditional way: in the garb of a pilgrim, lifting his tunic to demonstrate the plague sore in his thigh. Even Giorgio Vasari, who did not think much of artists north of the Alps, praised it in his Le Vite and called it "a miracle in wood", though misattributing it.

Veit Stoss was buried at St. Johannis cemetery in Nuremberg.

== Artistic sons ==
His artistic legacy was continued by his sons, of whom Stanislaus (Polish: Stanisław; d. 1528), worked from 1505 on as a woodcarver in Krakow, while three other sons settled in Transylvania sometime after 1515: Johann (Hans; painter and woodcarver, author of masterful winged altarpieces; d. before 1531) in Schäßburg (Sighişoara), goldsmith Martin in Medwisch (Mediaş), and woodcarver Veit the Younger in Kronstadt (Braşov), where he died before 1534.

== In popular culture ==
Veit Stoss is featured in Judith Weir's opera, The Black Spider. He is one of the singing sculptors in Act 3 Scene 2 inside the Wawel Cathedral. He is shown chiseling at the tomb of King Casimir IV. There is a Polish book (1913) and film (1961) Historia żółtej ciżemki (The story of a yellow crakow) about Veit Stoss in Cracow.

== See also ==
- Master Paul of Levoča

== Sources ==
- Baxandall, Michael (1980). The Limewood Sculptors of Renaissance Germany. Yale University Press. ISBN 0-300-02829-6.
- Bautz, Traugott, ed. (1996). "Stoss, Veit". Biographisch-Bibliographisches Kirchenlexikon (BBKL) (in German). Vol. 11. Herzberg: Bautz. cols. 1–5. ISBN 3-88309-064-6.
- R. Kahnsitz, ed. (1983). Veit Stoss in Nürnberg. Werke des Meisters und seiner Schule in Nürnberg und Umgebung (catalogue of the exhibition) (in German). Munich.
- Kepinski, Zdzislaw (1981). Veit Stoss (in German). Verlag der Kunst. ISBN 83-221-0138-4.
- Kirkpatrick, Sidney (2010). Hitler's Holy Relics. Simon & Schuster. ISBN 978-1-4165-9062-0.
- Schultz, Ellen, ed. (1986). Gothic and Renaissance Art in Nuremberg. New York: Metropolitan Museum of Art. ISBN 978-0-87099-466-1.
- Skubiszewski, Piotr (1978). "Der Stil des Veit Stoss" (in German). 41 (2). Zeitschrift für Kunstgeschichte: 93–133.
- Snyder, James (1985). Northern Renaissance Art: Painting, Sculpture, the Graphic Arts From 1350 to 1575. Prentice-Hall / Harry N. Abrams. ISBN 0-13-623596-4.
