= Janina Domańska =

American writer (1913–1995)

Janina Domańska (28 July 1913 – 2 February 1995) was a Polish-born American artist, author and illustrator. She is best known for her self-illustrated children's books. She won a Caldecott Honor for her book If All the Seas Were One Sea in 1972.

== Personal life ==
Domańska was born in Warsaw. She graduated from the Academy of Fine Arts in Warsaw, Poland in 1939. She was held briefly in a concentration camp in Germany, before being released to stay with a doctor and his family in Germany. In 1946 Domanska studied painting in Italy, and then emigrated to the United States in 1952. She worked designing textiles before she began creating book illustrations. She was married to writer Jerzy Laskowski. And later to Ernest Nossen. She lived in New Fairfield, Connecticut.

== Career ==
Domańska wrote, adapted and translated 22 books with her own illustrations. She also illustrated 23 books by other authors. Her own titles include The Tortoise and the Tree, Din Dan Don It's Christmas, Spring is, and The Best of the Bargain. Her book King Krakus and the Dragon received a starred Kirkus review highlighting the "rich color, sumptuous design, and a splendid peacock of a dragon [that] adorn this old Polish tale of King Krakus who founded Krakow."

The books she illustrated that were written by others include an edition of Trumpeter of Kraków, the Newbery award winning children’s novel by Eric P. Kelly. Astrid Lindgren's Mischievous Meg; the 1992 version of The Bremen Town Musicians by the brothers Grimm; and Ten and a Kid by Sadie Rose Weilerstein, which won the 1962 National Jewish Book Award for children's literature.

She also created a poster supporting poetry in 1975 for the Children's Book Council

== Legacy ==
The Ezra Jack Keats/Janina Domanska Research Fellowship was established at the University of Southern Mississippi through the Ezra Jack Keats Foundation, the Janina Domanska Literary Estate, and the de Grummond Children's Literature Collection. The aim of the program was to support “scholars engaged in projects based substantially on the holdings of the de Grummond Children's Literature Collection.”

A selection of Domanska's papers relating to 14 books that she published between 1962-78 are held in the Children's Literature Resource Collection at the University of Minnesota Library. Damanska’s correspondence from 1966-1990 as well as books and cards she created are part of the Grummond Collection at the McCain Library at the University of Southern Mississippi.

== Publications ==
=== Author and illustrator ===
- Why So Much Noise? (1964) HarperCollins
- Palmiero and the Ogre (1967) by Macmillan
- Look, There is a Turtle Flying (1969) by Macmillan
- Marilka (1970) Macmillan
- If All The Seas Were One Sea (1971) Macmillan
- The Turnip (1972) Atheneum
- Little Red Hen (1973) Macmillan
- I Saw A Ship A-Sailing (1973) Hamish Hamilton
- What Do You See? (1974) Macmillan
- Din Dan Don, It's Christmas (1975) Greenwillow Books
- Spring Is (1976) by Greenwillow Books
- The Best of the Bargain (1977) Greenwillow Books
- The Tortoise and the Tree (1978) Greenwillow Books
- King Krakus and the Dragon (1979) Greenwillow Books
- A Scythe, a Rooster, and a Cat (1981) Greenwillow Books
- Marek, the Little Fool (1982) Greenwillow Books
- What Happens Next? (1983) by Greenwillow Books
- Busy Monday Morning (1985) Greenwillow Books
- The First Noel (1986) Greenwillow Books
- A Was an Angler (1991) Greenwillow Books
- Down on the Farm: Collection of Stories

=== Illustrator of books by other authors ===
- More Tales of Faraway Folk, by Babette Deutch and Avrahm Yarmolinsky (1952)
- Best in Children's Books 10, edited by Mary Macnab and Gladys Schwarz (1958) Doubleday
- Clocks Tell the Time, by Alma Kehoe Reck (1960) Charles Scribner
- Ten and a Kid, by Sadie Rose Weilerstein (1961) Jewish Publication Society of America
- The Song of the Lop-eared Mule, by Natalie Savage Carlson (1961) Harper Collins
- The Golden Seed, by Maria Konopnicka (1962) Scribner
- Mischievous Meg, by Astrid Lindgren (1962) Viking
- In Place of Katia, by Mara Kay (1963)
- I Like Weather, by Aileen Fisher (1963) Harper Collins
- The Magic World, by Elisabeth Beresford (1964) Bobbs-Merrill [Original title: Awkward Magic]
- The Coconut Thieves, adapted by Catharine Fournier (1964) Charles Scribner's Sons
- Nikkos and the Pink Pelican, by Ruth Tooze (1964) Viking Press
- Master of the Royal Cat, by Jerzy Laskowski (1965)
- The Trumpeter of Krakow, by Eric P. Kelly (original publication 1928) (1966) Macmillan
- The Black Heart of Indri, adapted by Dorothy Hoge (1966) Charles Scribner
- The Dragon liked Smoked Fish, by Jerzy Laskowski (1967)
- Whizz, by Edward Lear (1973), Macmillan
- The Fifth Day, by Mary Q. Steele (1978) Greenwillow Books
- The Bremen Town Musicians, by Jacob Grimm (1980) Greenwillow Books
- The Art of Polish Cooking, by Alina Żerańska (1989)
