= Three Linden Trees Tenement =

Under the Three Linden Trees Tenement, Bogaczowska Tenement
- Kamienica Pod Trzema Lipami
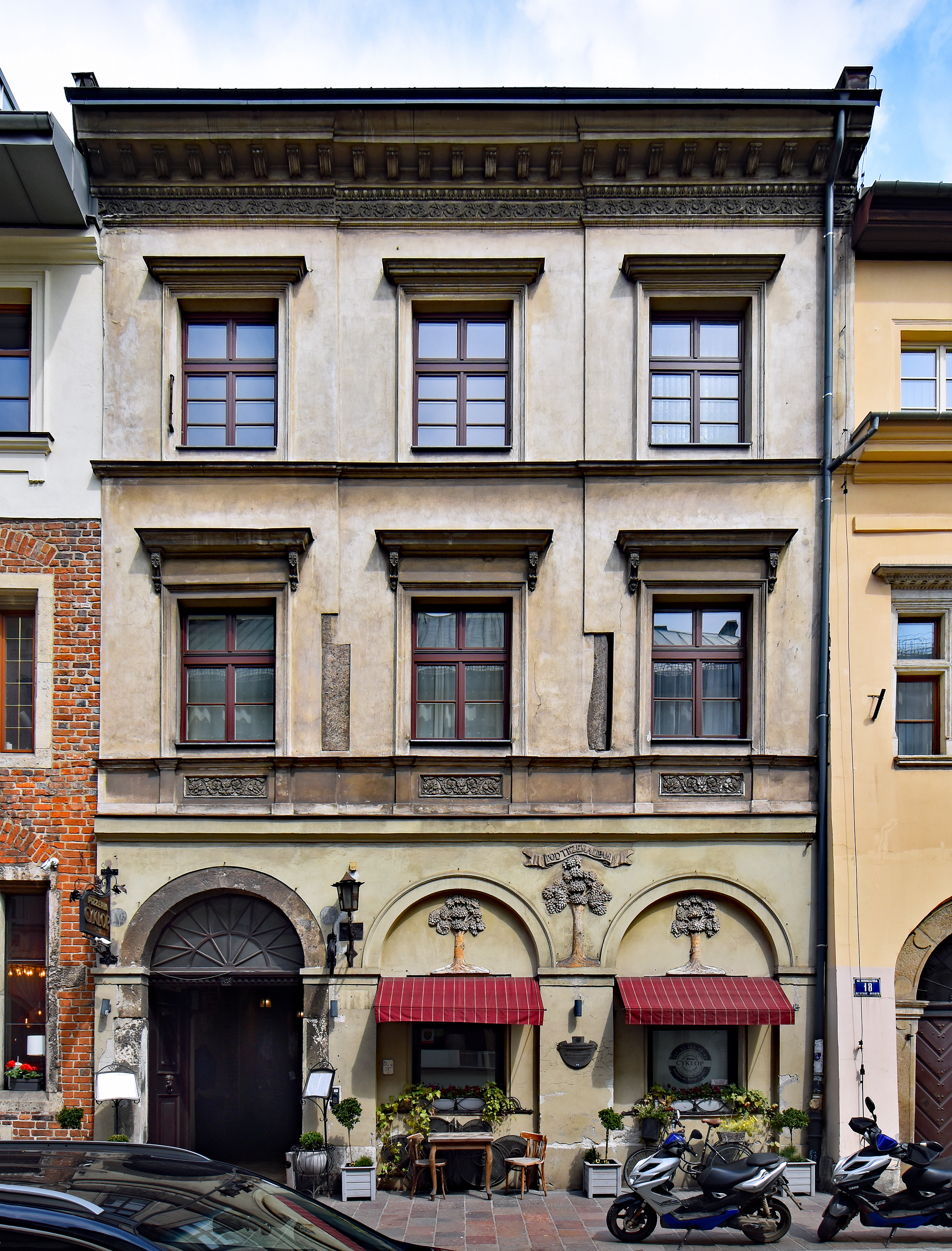

General information
- Address: 16 Mikołajska Street
- Town or city: Kraków
- Country: Poland
- Coordinates: 50°03′41.1″N 19°56′29.95″E

Under the Three Linden Trees Tenement House (also known as the Bogaczowska Tenement) (Polish: Kamienica Pod Trzema Lipami) is a tenement house located at 16 Mikołajska Street in Kraków in the District I Old Town.

== History ==
The tenement was built in the 14th century on the site of the former estate of the mayor Albert, which was demolished after his rebellion against the king was suppressed. Initially, it was a single-story building. In the 15th century, a first floor was added. At the beginning of the 19th century, it underwent a thorough reconstruction. It was then given a Neoclassical facade, and above the ground floor, an emblem depicting three linden trees of varying heights was placed. Above the tallest tree, positioned at the center of the composition, an inscription with the name of the tenement was added. In 1873, the building was extended with a second floor.

On March 23, 1968 , the villa was entered into the Registry of Cultural Property. It is also entered into the municipal register of monuments of the Lesser Poland Voivodeship.

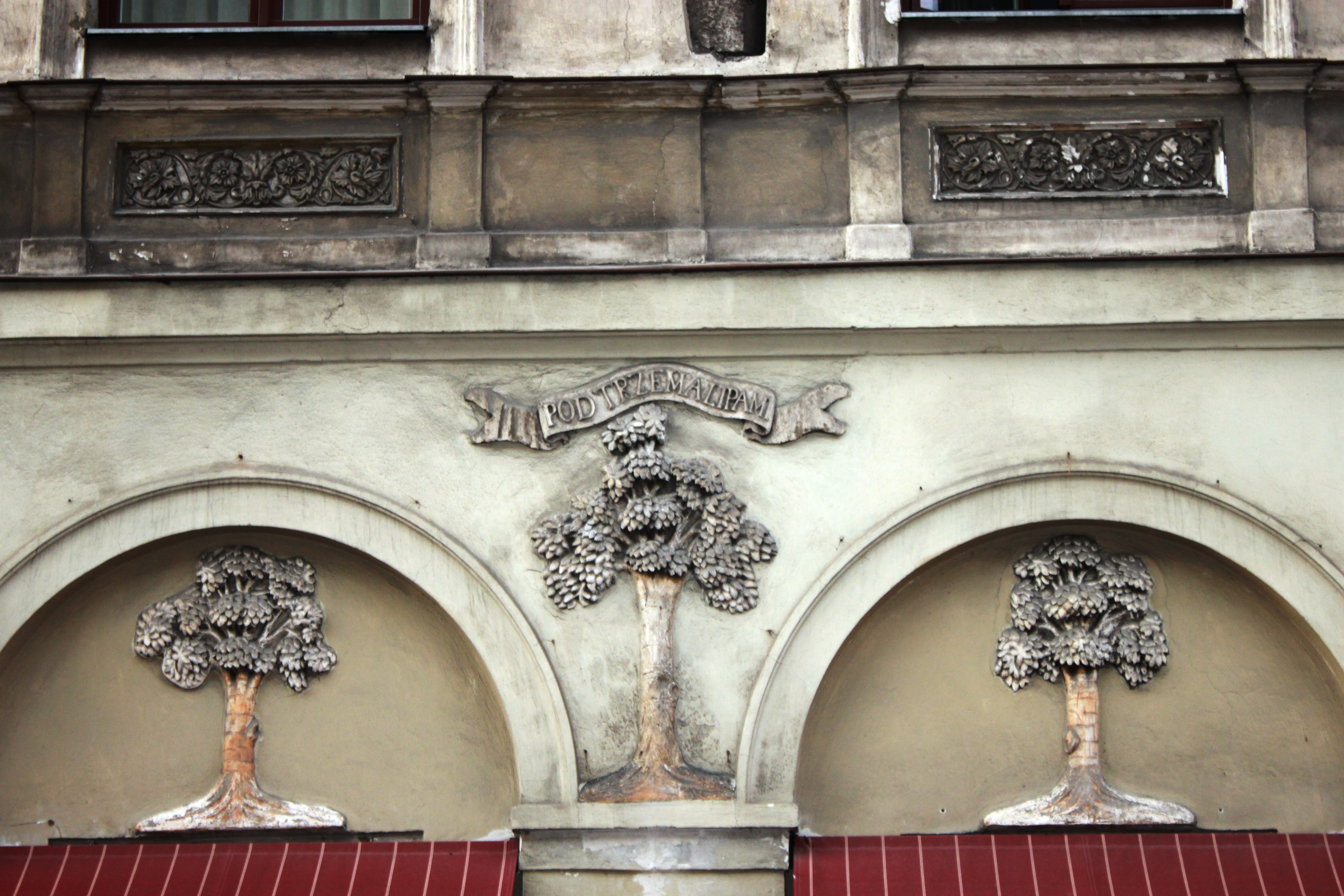
Reliefs on the facade
