= St. Mary's Trumpet Call =

Bugle call from Krakow

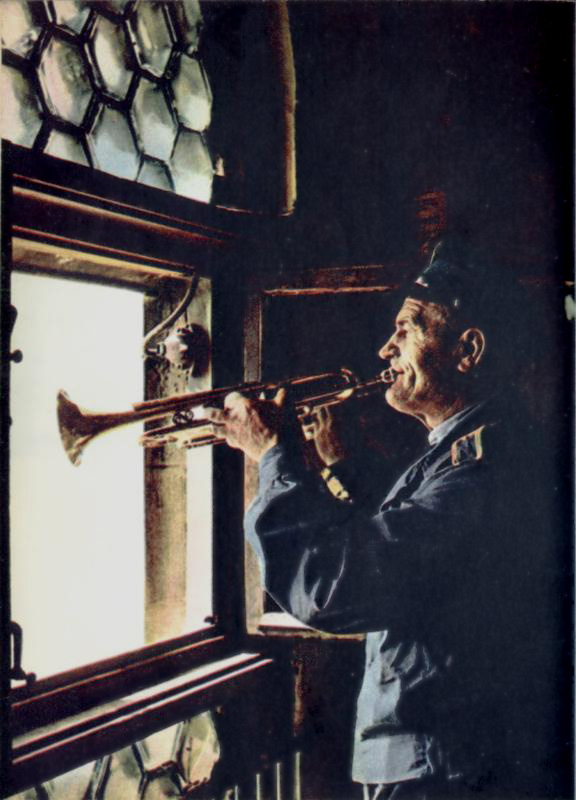
Trumpeter playing Hejnał Mariacki

Hejnał mariacki
Kraków historic trumpet alert to the city Hejnał mariacki

St. Mary's Trumpet Call (Polish: Hejnał mariacki; Polish pronunciation: [xɛjnaw], derived from the Hungarian expression Szűz Mária hajnala meaning "Virgin Mary's dawn") is a traditional, five-note Polish bugle call closely bound to the history and traditions of Kraków. It is played every hour on the hour, four times in succession in each of the four cardinal directions, by a trumpeter on the highest tower of the city's Saint Mary's Church. The noon performance is broadcast via radio to all of Poland and the world.

== History ==
=== Origins ===
The real origin and author of the hejnał are unknown. The earliest written mention of it appears in civic pay records of 1392. The word hejnał comes from hajnal, the Hungarian word for "dawn". These two facts fit well with a putative origin under King Louis I "the Hungarian" (r. in Poland 1370–1382) or his daughter Jadwiga, Queen of Poland (r. 1384–1399). Trumpet calls were used in many European cities to signal the opening and closing of city gates at dawn and dusk. The four directions in which the St. Mary's Trumpet Call is currently sounded correspond roughly to the four main Kraków gates before 3 out of 4 of the gates were demolished in the 19th century. 16th-century sources mention other trumpeters on other towers, and it is possible that the “interrupted” anthem was originally meant to allow a second trumpeter at a gate to signal the completion of the opening or closing of the gate. In historic times, trumpet calls on the St. Mary's Church tower were also used to warn of fires and other dangers.

=== Legends ===
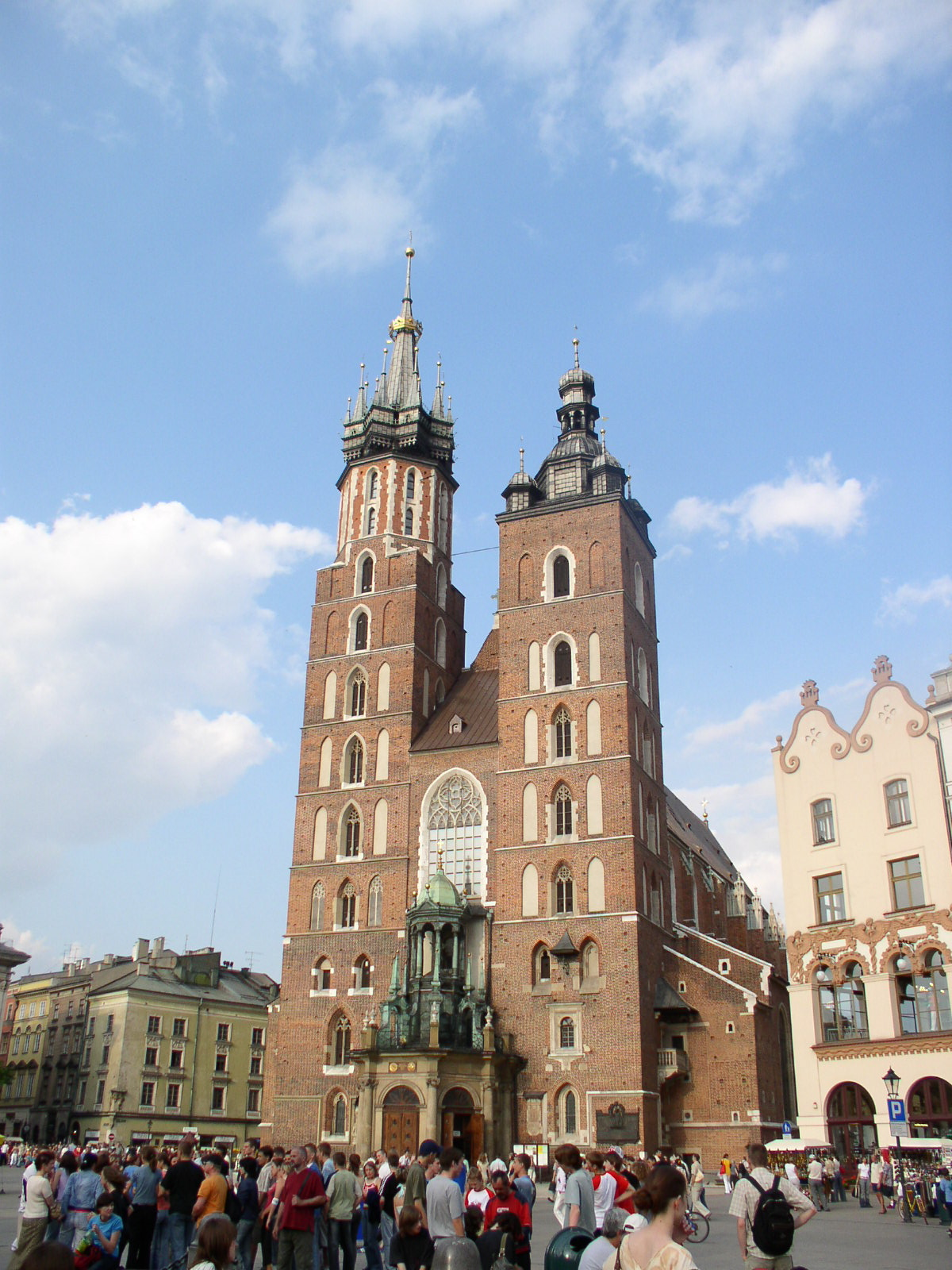
The trumpeter appears in the upper windows in the tower on the left.

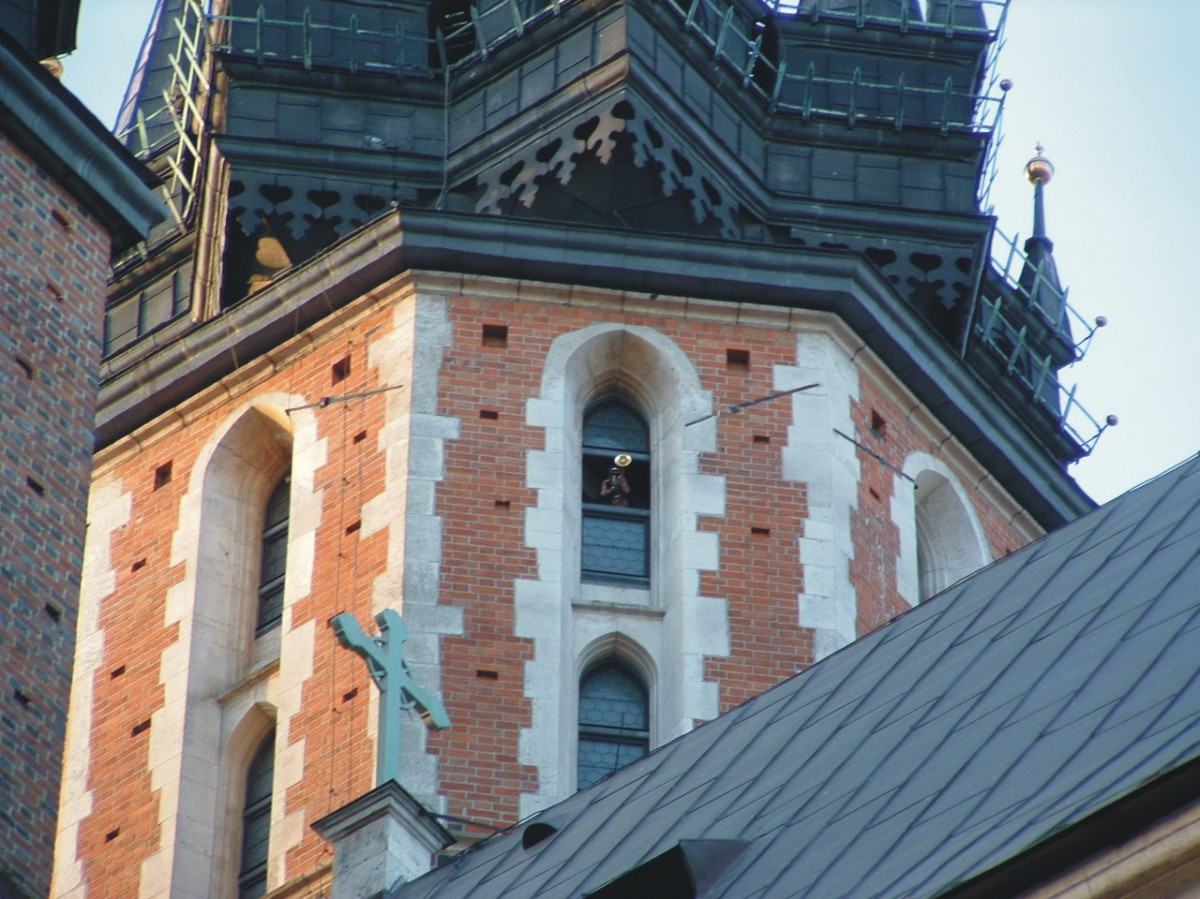
Hejnał played "for the King", towards the south.

According to a popular 20th-century legend, during a Mongol invasion of Poland (the invasion usually cited is that of 1241), Mongol troops led by General Subutai approached Kraków. A sentry on a tower of St Mary's Church sounded the alarm by playing the Hejnał, and the city gates were closed before the Tatars could ambush the city. The trumpeter, however, was shot in the throat by an arrow and did not complete the anthem, and this is the legendary reason as to why performances end abruptly before completion.

The earliest written version of this legend is from the prologue to American Eric P. Kelly’s 1928 children's book The Trumpeter of Krakow. Kelly, who was teaching at the Jagiellonian University on a scholar exchange in 1925–26, admitted that he did not speak the Polish language very well when he wrote the story, and had relied on French-speaking friends to translate. Part of the current legend may come from a more recent historic incident when a trumpeter died of natural causes while on duty at midnight on 7 July 1901. A 1926 tourist guide vaguely states that the death of a trumpeter was the reason for the premature ending of the anthem, but does not mention the Tartar siege or arrows.

Another possible reason is Ludwik Anczyc's 1861 version of the Lajkonik legend, which describes the sentry and the invading Tatars without mentioning arrows or the sentry's death. It is possible that Kelly was simply the first to write down the full version of an existing Cracovian legend that had escaped earlier collectors. It is also possible that he was the victim of a hoax or accidentally conflated two different stories. It is certainly remarkable that Professor Karol Estreicher, Jr.’s thorough 1931 guide to Kraków does not include the story.

Whatever the origins of Kelly's story, it proved popular in Kraków. The first written version of the full Tartars and arrows version in Polish is from a 1935 tourist guide. The second appears in a fiction sequel by Ksawery Pruszyński (who was a student at the Jagiellonian University while Kelly was teaching and was later Estreicher's assistant) entitled The Trumpeter of Samarkand which also ties into the Lajkonik legend. After the Second World War, Kelly's role in the legend was largely forgotten and the legend began to be passed down in true folk fashion.

Another recent tradition has it that the four directions in which the tune is played are in honour of the King (southwards towards Wawel Castle); the Mayor or Bishop towards City Hall or Bishop's Palace on Kanonicza Street, the citizens towards Main Market Square, and the peasants and visitors (towards the fields outside Kraków and the Barbican of Krakow). At the end of each tune the trumpeter waves at the people in the square who are expected to wave back.

=== Later usage ===
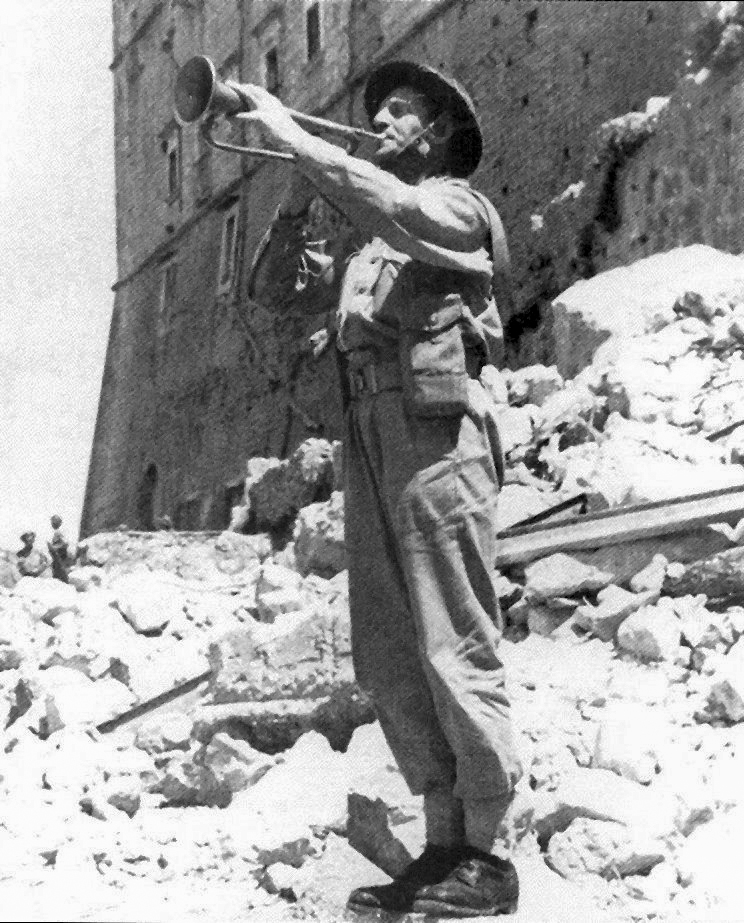
The Hejnał being played at foot of Monte Cassino Abbey after Allied victory in the Battle of Monte Cassino.

The Hejnał was traditionally played twice a day, usually at dawn and dusk; noon was added later. Today, the trumpeter plays hourly, though sleepy trumpeters are sometimes reported to have missed one of the early morning hours. Since 1927 the Hejnał has been broadcast live on Polskie Radio (the Polish national radio station) from St Mary's Church daily at noon. In November 2026, the trumpet call was suspended for twelve hours, from 9 p.m. on Saturday, November 7 to 9 a.m. on Sunday November 8, as a mark of mourning following a deadly attack in Kraków's Main Market Square; this was the first interruption of the tradition since 1939.

The Kraków Hejnał is well known throughout Poland and has been used as a national symbol. During the Second World War, a bugler from the 2nd Polish Corps played the tune to announce the Polish victory in the Battle of Monte Cassino on 18 May 1944.

Exiled Polish soldiers stationed in Cupar in Fife in eastern Scotland during the Second World War, who were deployed in the coastal defence of the area, imported the tradition of sounding the Hejnał (once a day) from the tower of the Corn Exchange building in the town from 1941 until 1946.

Historical records show that the practice of playing the Hejnał has been cancelled and then later reinstated several times, with a particularly long gap before it was reinstated in 1810. The Hejnał Mariacki was replaced twice by the mourning song Łzy Matki (English: "The Tears of the Mother"). The first time was at noon on 3 April 2005, due to the death of Pope John Paul II the previous day, and the second at two minutes after noon on 11 April 2010 following the deaths of President Lech Kaczyński and his consort, Maria Kaczyńska.

=== Players ===
Originally played by the town guard, since the 19th century the Hejnał has been performed by active members of the fire brigade, who also use the church tower as a lookout post. There are at least four different buglers serving in shifts at the tower.

The longest-serving trumpeter was Adolf Śmietana, who played the Hejnał for 36 years beginning in 1926. The Kołton family has played the Hejnał for three consecutive generations. In October 2004, Jan Kołton retired after 33 years of service at the tower. His father had been a Hejnał bugler for 35 years previously, while his son is one of the four current buglers.

On 11 June 2000 the melody was listed in the Guinness Book of Records after it was played by almost 2,000 trumpeters from all over the world. They included military orchestras from Poland, the United Kingdom, Belgium and Spain, as well as civilians. The youngest bugler was eight years old; the oldest was 79.

== See also ==
- Culture of Kraków
- Tower music
