= Mikołajska Street, Kraków =

Street in Kraków, Poland

Mikołajska Street
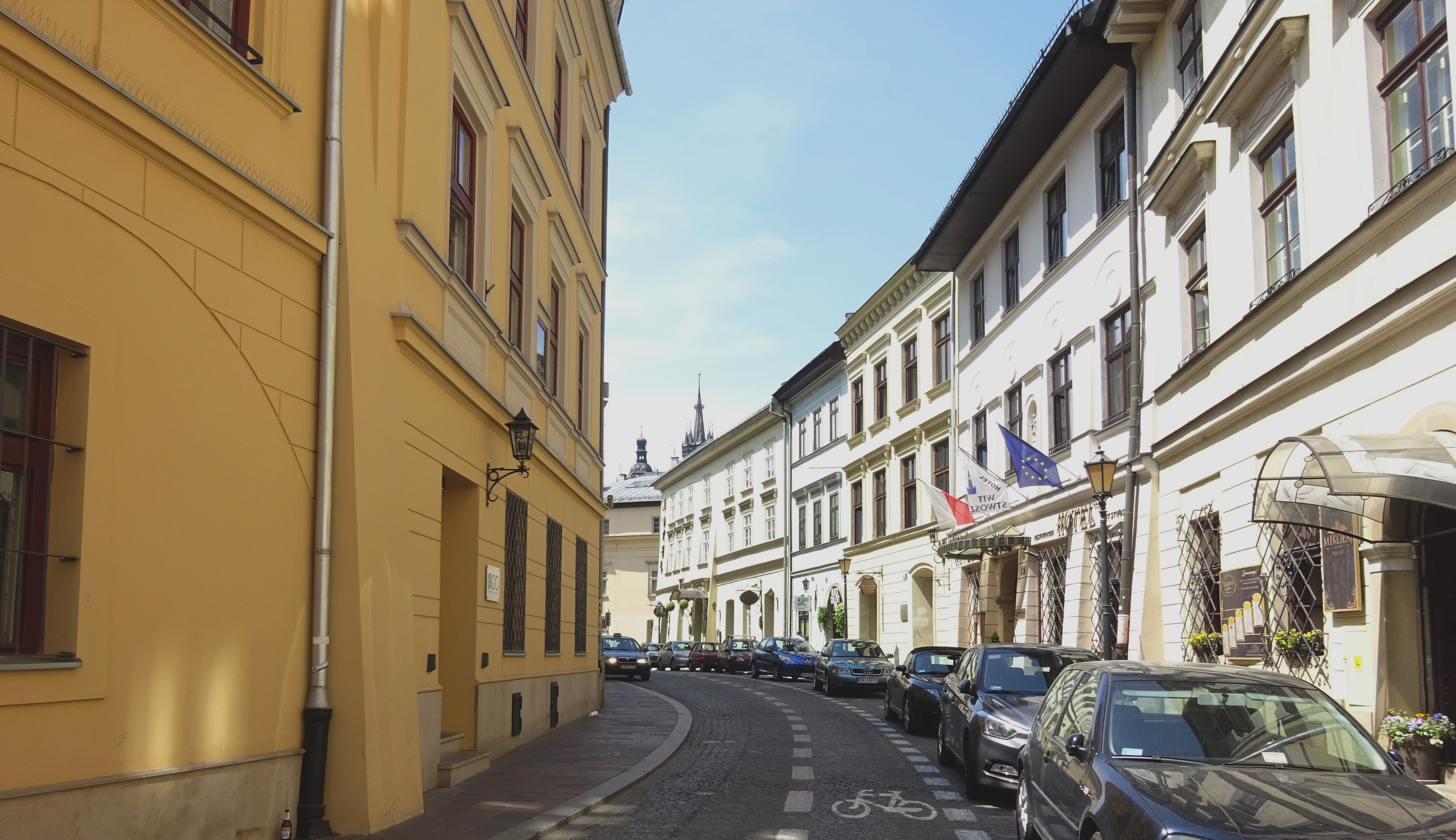
- View from Planty Park towards the Main Square. Towering above are the towers of St. Mary's Basilica.

- Length: 280 m (920 ft)
- West end: Szpitalna Street; Mały Rynek
- East end: Westerplatte Street; Mikołaja Kopernika Street

UNESCO World Heritage Site
- Type: Cultural
- Criteria: iv
- Designated: 1978
- Part of: Historic Centre of Kraków
- Reference no.: 29
- Region: Europe and North America

Historic Monument of Poland
- Designated: 1994-09-08
- Part of: Kraków historical city complex
- Reference no.: M.P. 1994 nr 50 poz. 418

Mikołajska Street (Polish: Ulica Mikołajska, lit. Nicholas Street) – a historic street in the Old Town of Kraków, Poland.

The street runs from Mały Rynek (lit. Little Market Square) towards the junction with Westerplatte Street, where it continues as Kopernika Street. The Planty Park is located next to the junction.

The street was outlined during when the settlement of Kraków was granted city rights in 1257. Located east of the centre of Kraków, the street served as a direct route towards to Ruthenia. The etymology of the street's name comes from the Church of St. Nicholas, located by the route. Locally, the street was named Rzeźnicza Street (Ulica Rzeźnicza) due to the numerous stalls selling meat.

== Features ==
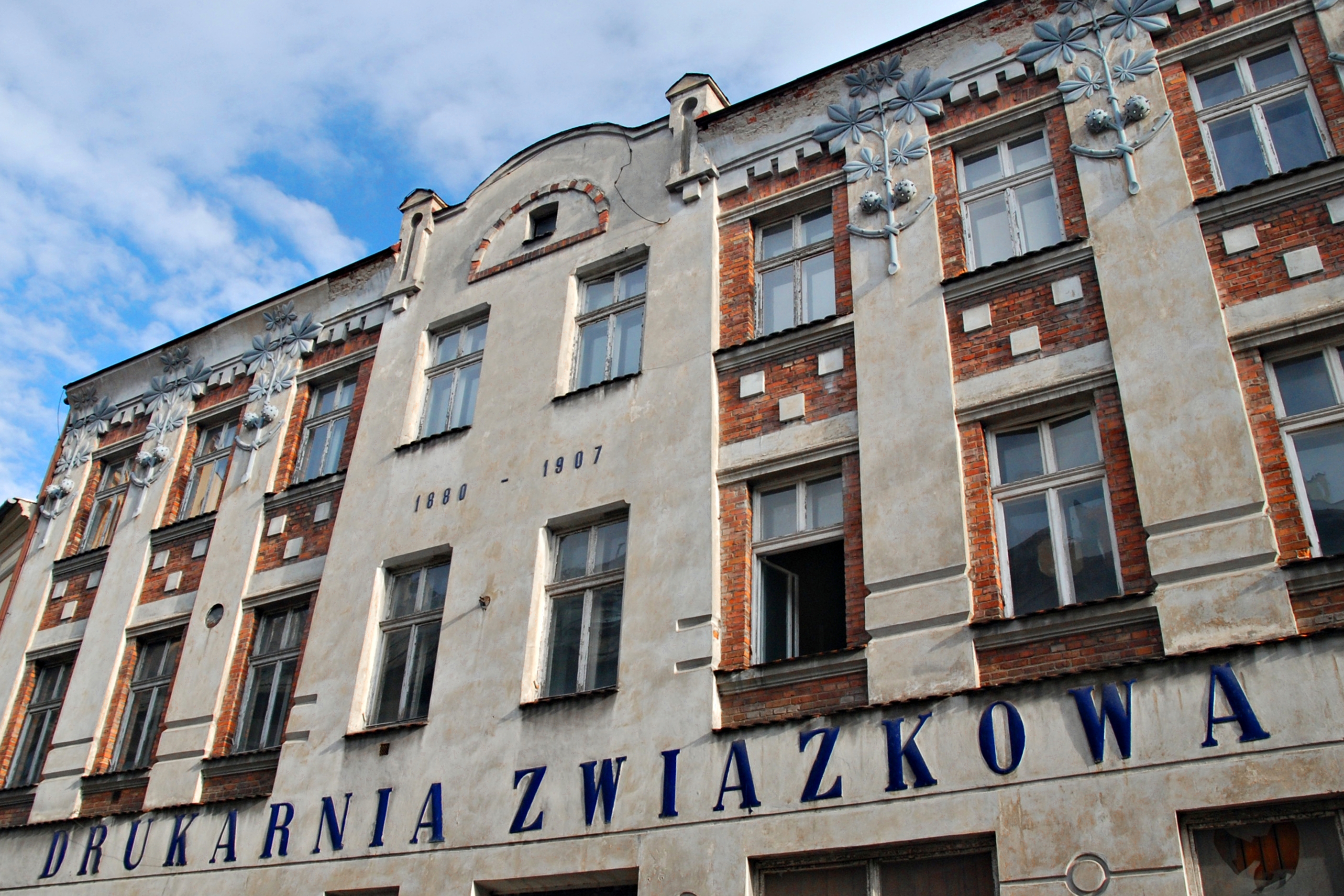
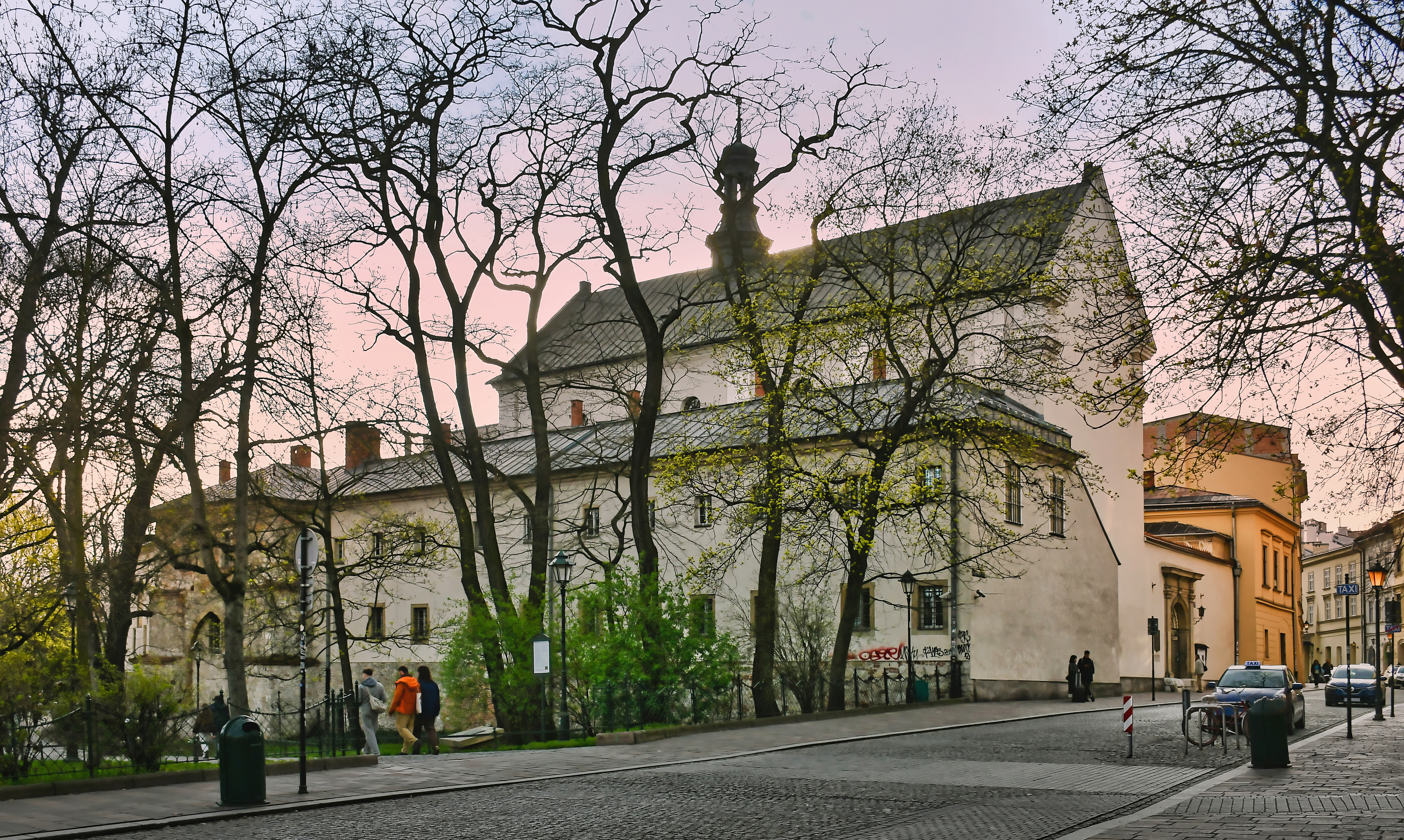
| Street No. | Short description | Picture |
|---|---|---|
| 13-15 | Cooperative Printing House (Drukarnia Związkowa) – built between 1906 and 1907 under architect Rajmund Meus' designs. Presently, since its 2012 renovation, the building houses offices and apartments. |
| 21 | Church of Our Lady of the Snows – a Baroque church built in 1632. The church's construction was funded by Anna Branicka. The church building is adjoined with the Rzeźnicza Gate built in 1288. |
