= Basilica of the Assumption of the Blessed Virgin Mary, Kraków =

Roman Catholic church in Kraków Old Town, Poland

Coordinates: 50°03′42″N 19°56′21″E

Basilica of the Assumption of the Blessed Virgin Mary
- Bazylika Wniebowzięcia Najświętszej Marii Panny
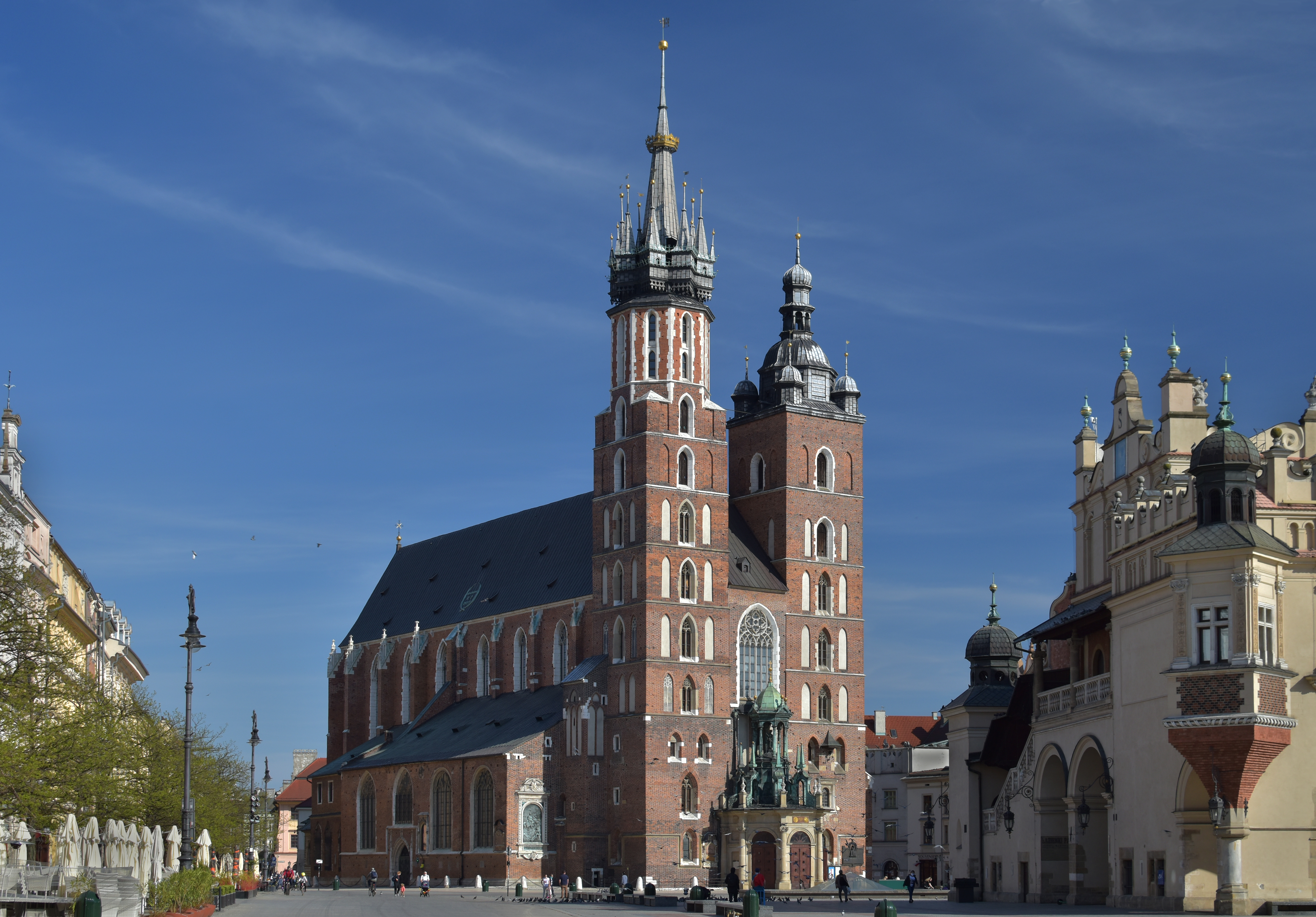
- Exterior of the church, view from the west
- Basilica of the Assumption of the Blessed Virgin Mary
- Location: Mariacki Square; Kraków
- Country: Poland
- Denomination: Roman Catholic
- Website: http://www.mariacki.com/en/

History
- Founder: Casimir III the Great

Architecture
- Architectural type: Polish Brick Gothic
- Completed: 1347

UNESCO World Heritage Site
- Type: Cultural
- Criteria: iv
- Designated: 1978
- Part of: Historic Centre of Kraków
- Reference no.: 29
- Region: Europe and North America

Historic Monument of Poland
- Designated: 1994-09-08
- Part of: Kraków historical city complex
- Reference no.: M.P. 1994 nr 50 poz. 418

Hejnał mariacki
Cracow historic trumpet alert to the city Hejnał mariacki

The Basilica of the Assumption of the Blessed Virgin Mary (Polish: Bazylika Wniebowzięcia Najświętszej Marii Panny), known colloquially as the St. Mary's Basilica (Polish: Bazylika Mariacka), is a historic Roman Catholic parish church located at Mariacki Square at the north-eastern corner of the Main Market Square in the Old Town of Kraków, Poland.

It is a Brick Gothic church. Built in the 14th century, its foundations date back to the early 13th century and serve as one of the best examples of Polish Gothic architecture. Standing 80 m (262 ft) tall, it is particularly famous for its wooden altarpiece carved by Veit Stoss (Wit Stwosz). Some of its monumental polychrome murals were designed by Poland's leading history painter, Jan Matejko (1838–1893). In 1978, it became a UNESCO World Heritage Site alongside the Historic Centre of Kraków.

On every hour, 24 hours a day, 365 days a year, a trumpet signal—called the Hejnał mariacki—is played from the top of the taller of Saint Mary's two towers. The plaintive tune breaks off in mid-stream, supposedly to commemorate a famous 13th-century trumpeter who was shot in the throat while sounding the alarm before a Mongol attack on the city (the first account of this legend originates in a 1928 American novel, The Trumpeter of Krakow). The noon-time hejnał is heard across Poland and abroad broadcast live by Polish Radio Jedynka.

Saint Mary's Basilica also served as an architectural model for many of the churches that were built by the Polish diaspora abroad, particularly those like Saint Michael's and Saint John Cantius in Chicago, designed in the Polish Cathedral style.

The church is familiar to many English-speaking readers from the 1928 book The Trumpeter of Krakow by Eric P. Kelly.

== History ==
According to chronicler Jan Długosz, Saint Mary's Basilica in the Main Square in Kraków was founded in 1221–22 by the Bishop of Kraków, Iwo Odrowąż. The building was destroyed during the Mongol invasion of Poland. Between 1290 and 1300 the new early Gothic church was built on the remaining foundations. It was consecrated twenty years later, in 1320.

The church was completely rebuilt during the reign of Casimir III the Great between 1355 and 1365 with substantial contributions from wealthy restaurateur Mikołaj Wierzynek. The presbytery was elongated and tall windows added. The main body of the church was completed in 1395–97 with the new vault constructed by master Nicholas Wernher from Prague. However, the vault over the presbytery collapsed in 1442 due to a possible earthquake, which has never happened before nor since in Kraków.

In the first half of the 15th century, the side chapels were added. Most of them were the work of master Franciszek Wiechoń. At the same time the northern tower was raised and designed to serve as the watch tower for the entire city. In 1478 carpenter Maciej Heringh (or Heringk) funded a helmet for the tower. A gilded crown was placed on it in 1666, which is still present today. At the end of the 15th century, Saint Mary's church was enriched with a sculptural masterpiece, an Altarpiece of Veit Stoss (Ołtarz Mariacki Wita Stwosza) of late Gothic design.

In 1536/37, King Sigismund I. declared that the sermons in the church should be changed from German to Polish. The large German community of Kraków were relocating their place of worship to the smaller Saint Barbara's church.

In the 18th century, by the decision of vicar Jacek Augustyn Łopacki, the interior was rebuilt in the late Baroque style. The author of this work was Francesco Placidi. All 26 altars, equipment, furniture, benches and paintings were replaced and the walls were decorated with polychrome, the work of Andrzej Radwański. In the years immediately before 1730 the Venetian painter Giambattista Pittoni painted five altarpieces for the side altars of the central nave: The Annunciation, The Adoration of the Magi, Madonna and Child with St. Philip Neri, Mary Magdalene, St. Sebastian.

At the beginning of the 19th century, the city decided that a cemetery near the basilica was to be shut down and replaced by a public square. Today, it is known as Plac Mariacki (Marian Square). In the years 1887–1891, under the direction of Tadeusz Stryjeński, the neo-Gothic design was introduced into the basilica. The temple gained a new design and murals painted and funded by Jan Matejko, who worked with Stanisław Wyspiański and Józef Mehoffer - the authors of stained glass in the presbytery.

In the 1990s, the church was renovated, ending with the replacement of the roof in 2003.

On 18 April 2010, in Saint Mary's Basilica, a funeral ceremony for Polish president Lech Kaczyński and his wife Maria was held. The coffins were later transported and buried in one of the crypts of Wawel Cathedral.

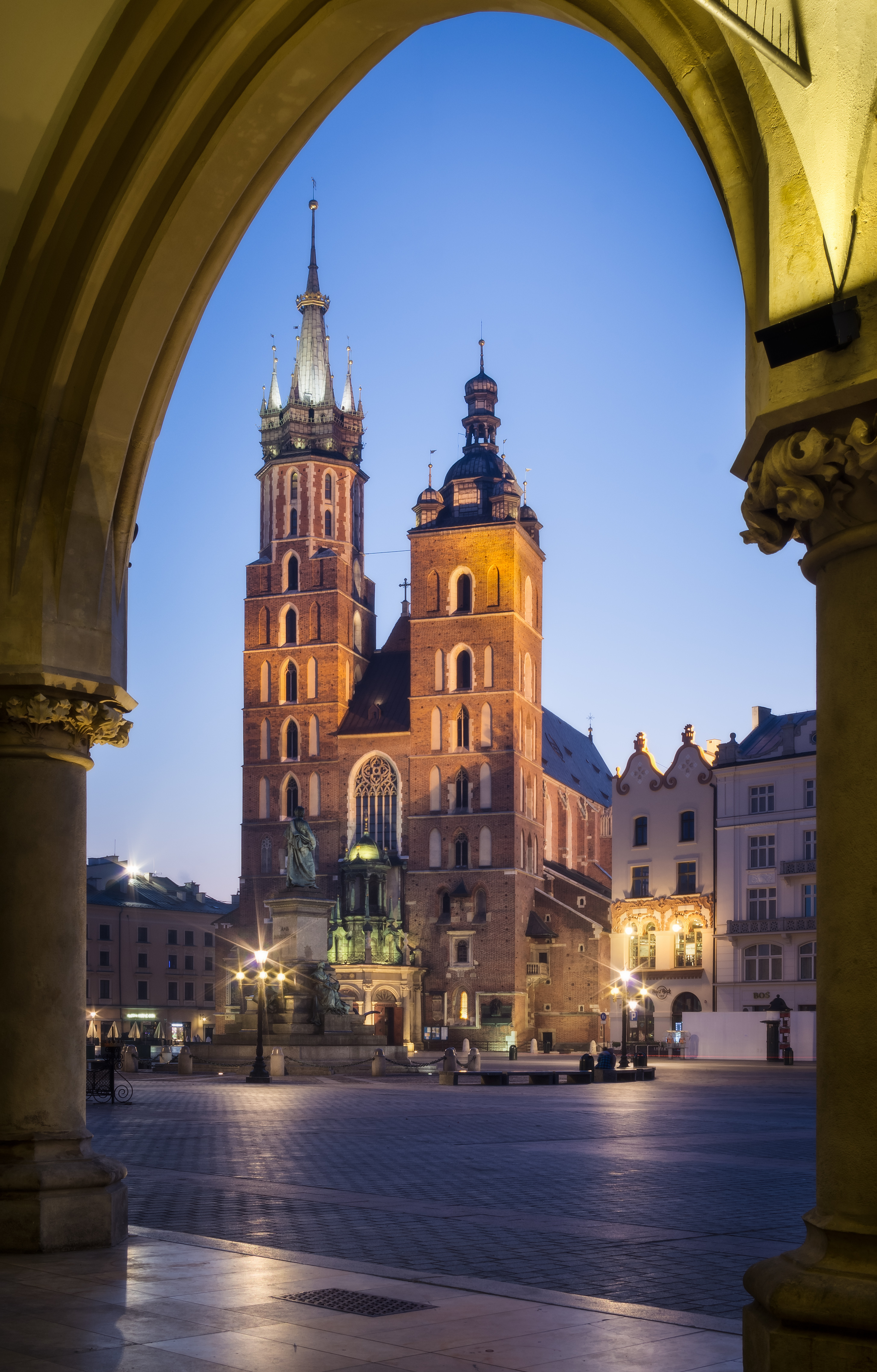
View from under the arcades of the Cloth Hall

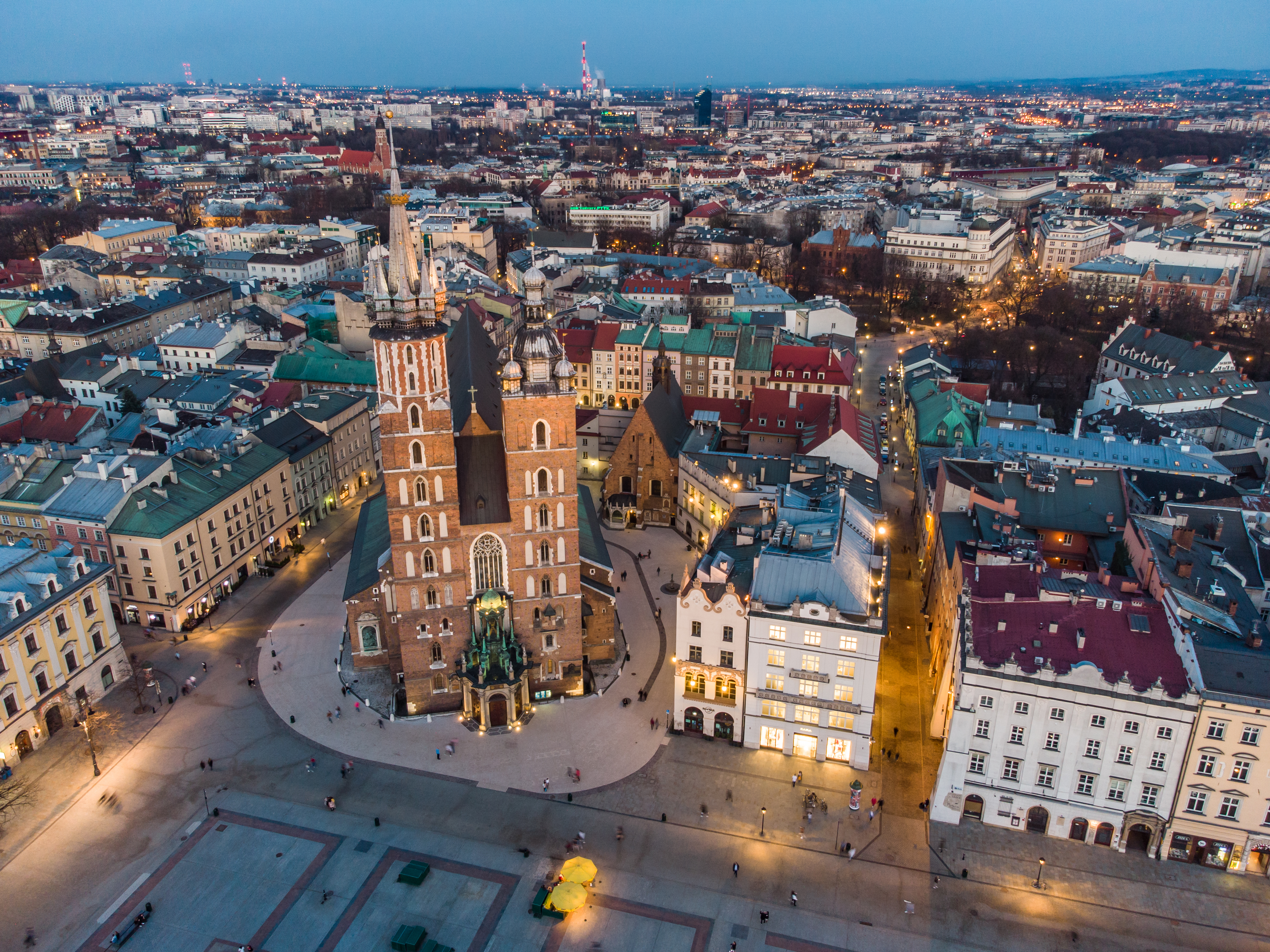
Aerial view

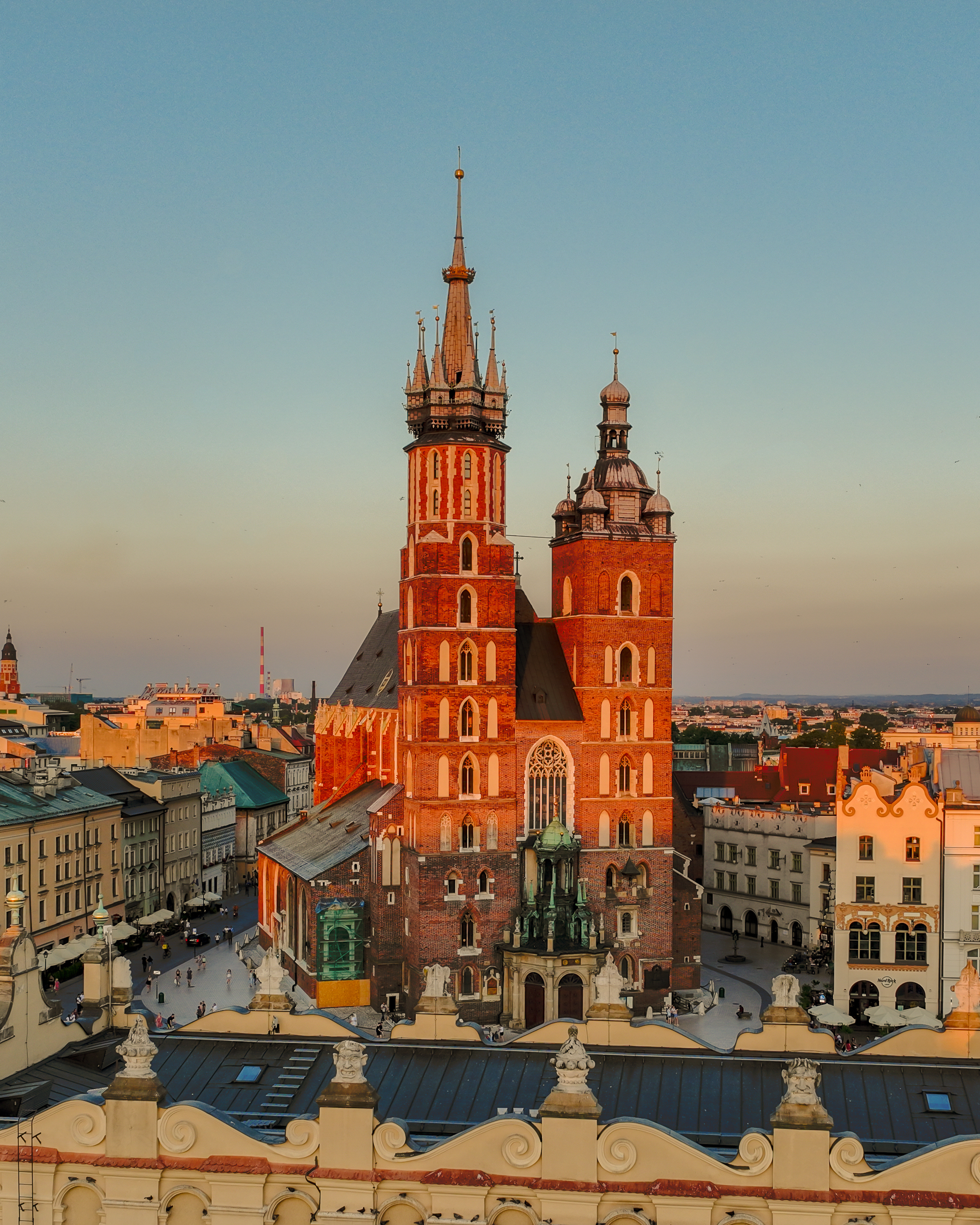
Saint Mary's Church at sunset

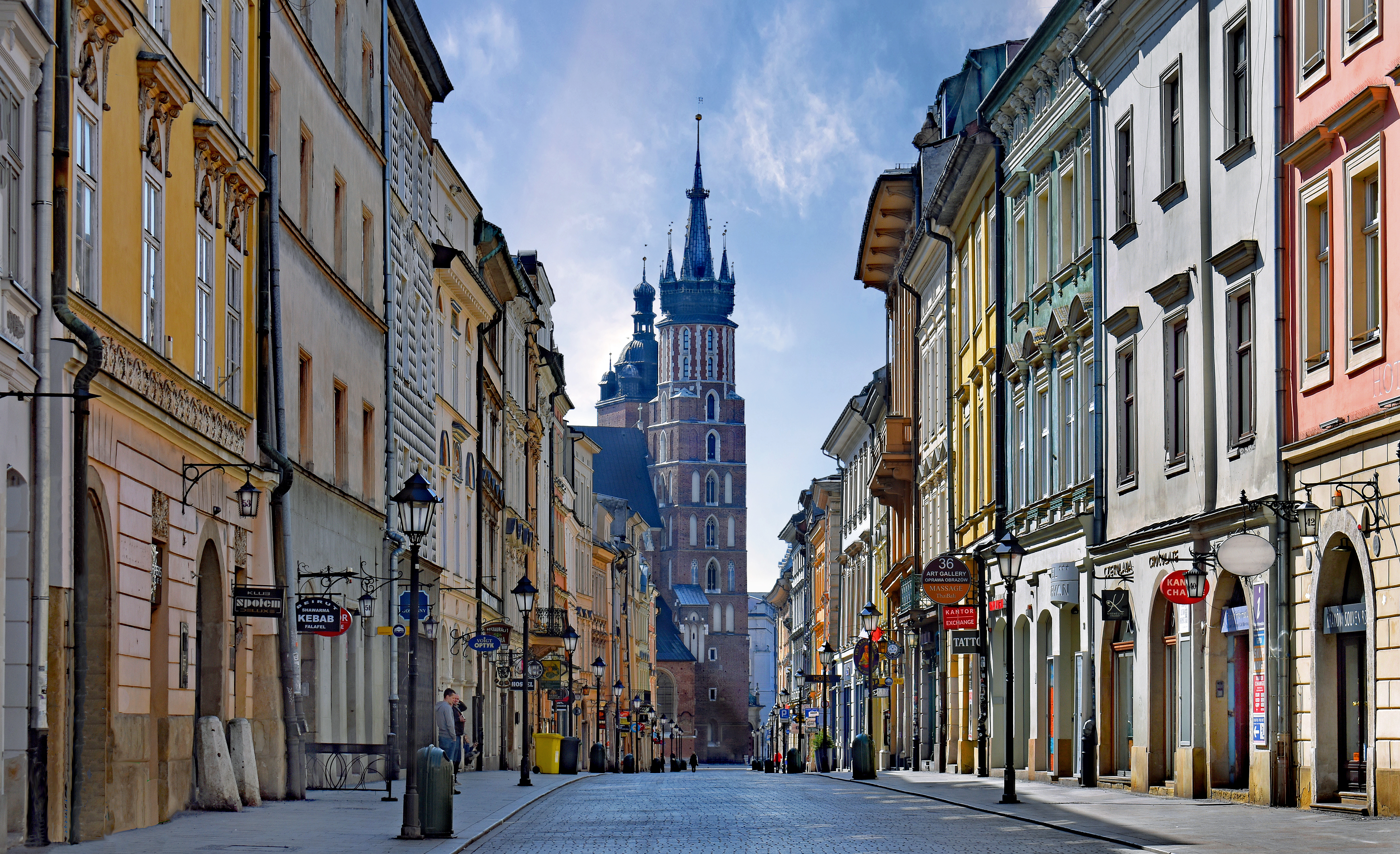
View from the north. The church building closes the perspective of Floriańska Street.

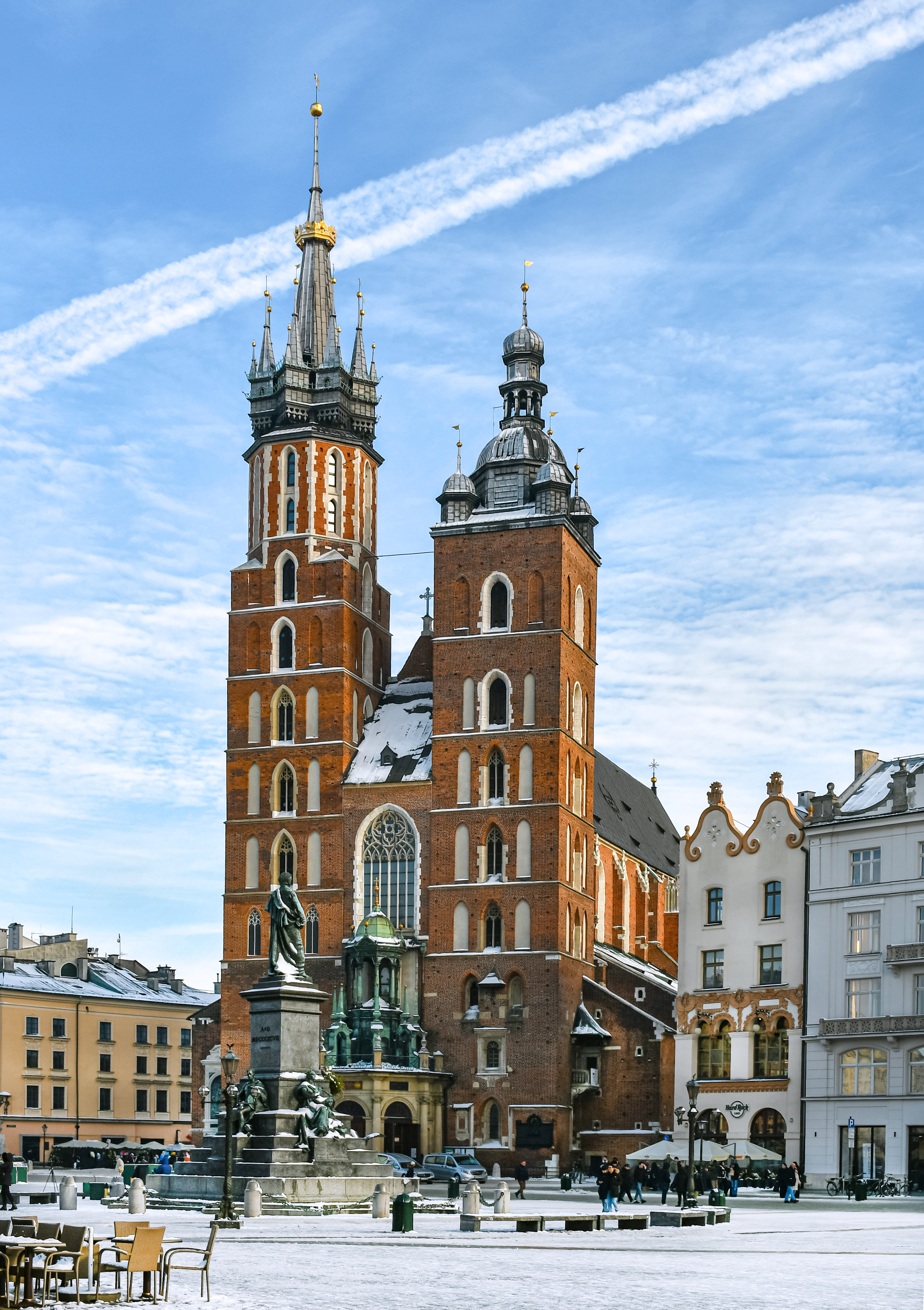
Church and Adam Mickiewicz Monument

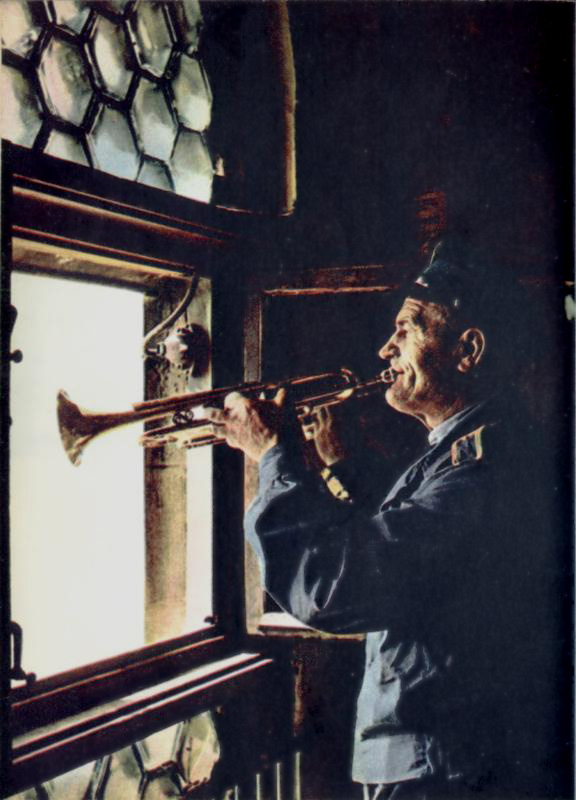
Trumpeter, Hejnalista, on the higher church tower
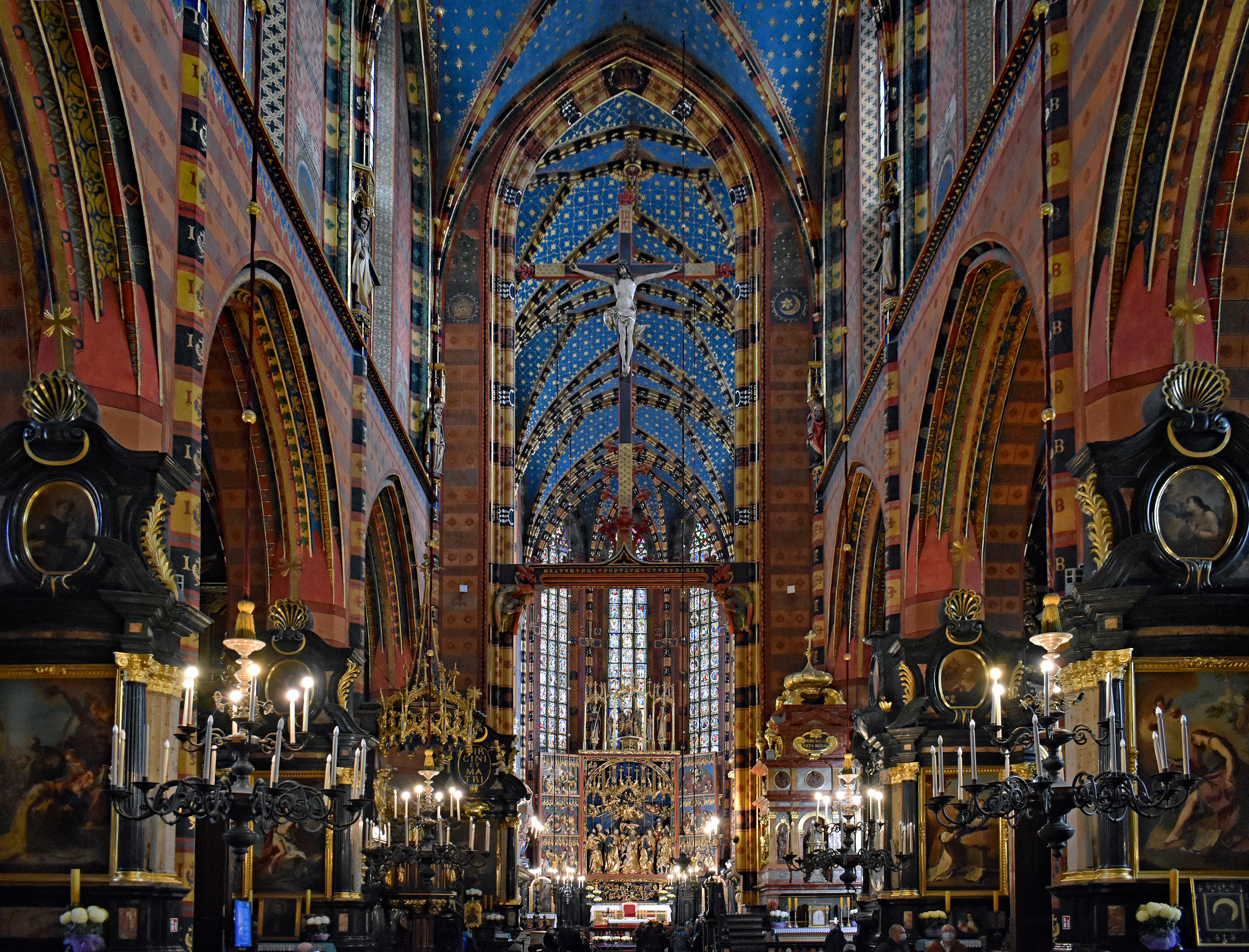
Main nave

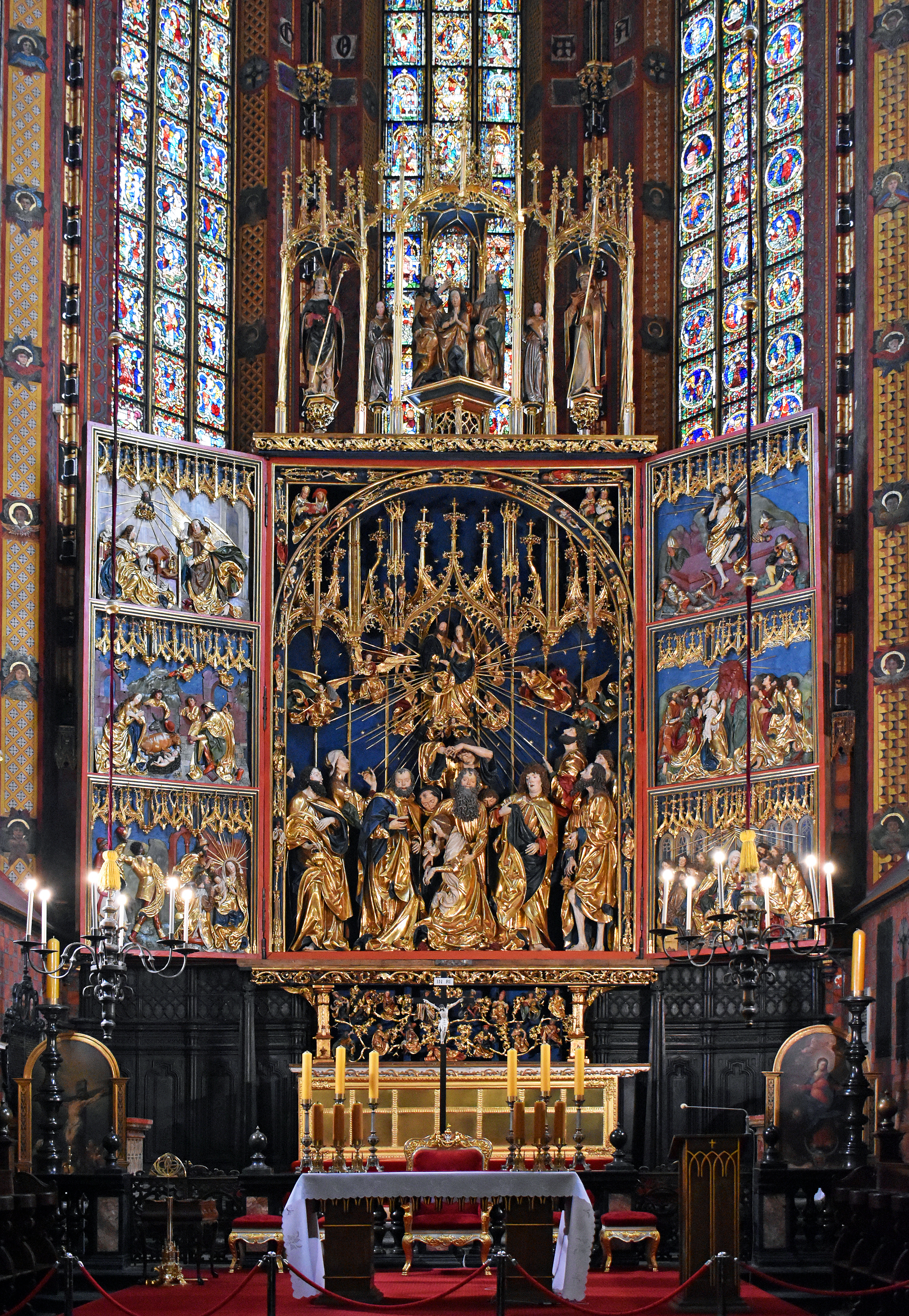
Gothic altarpiece by Veit Stoss

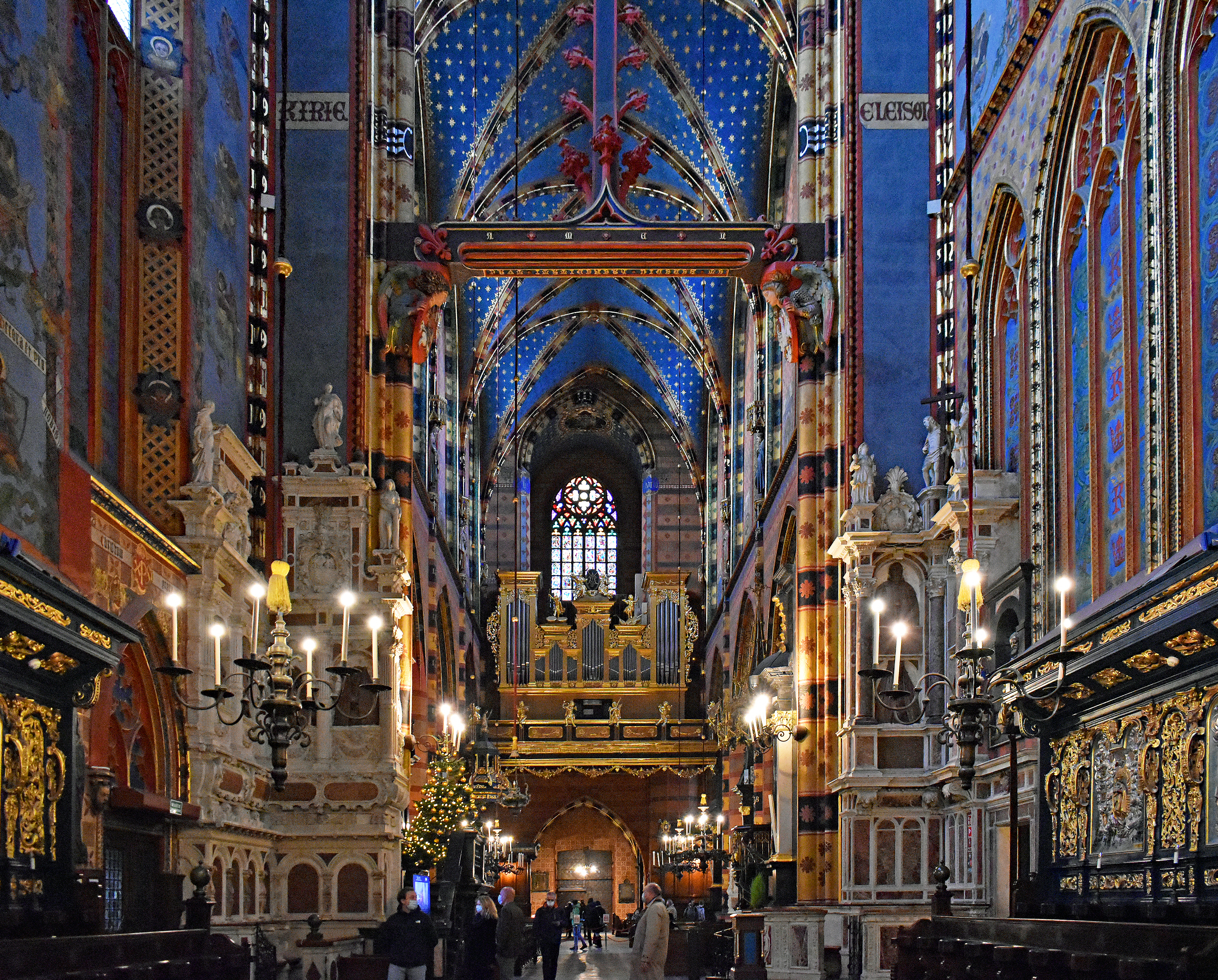
Interior viewed from main altar

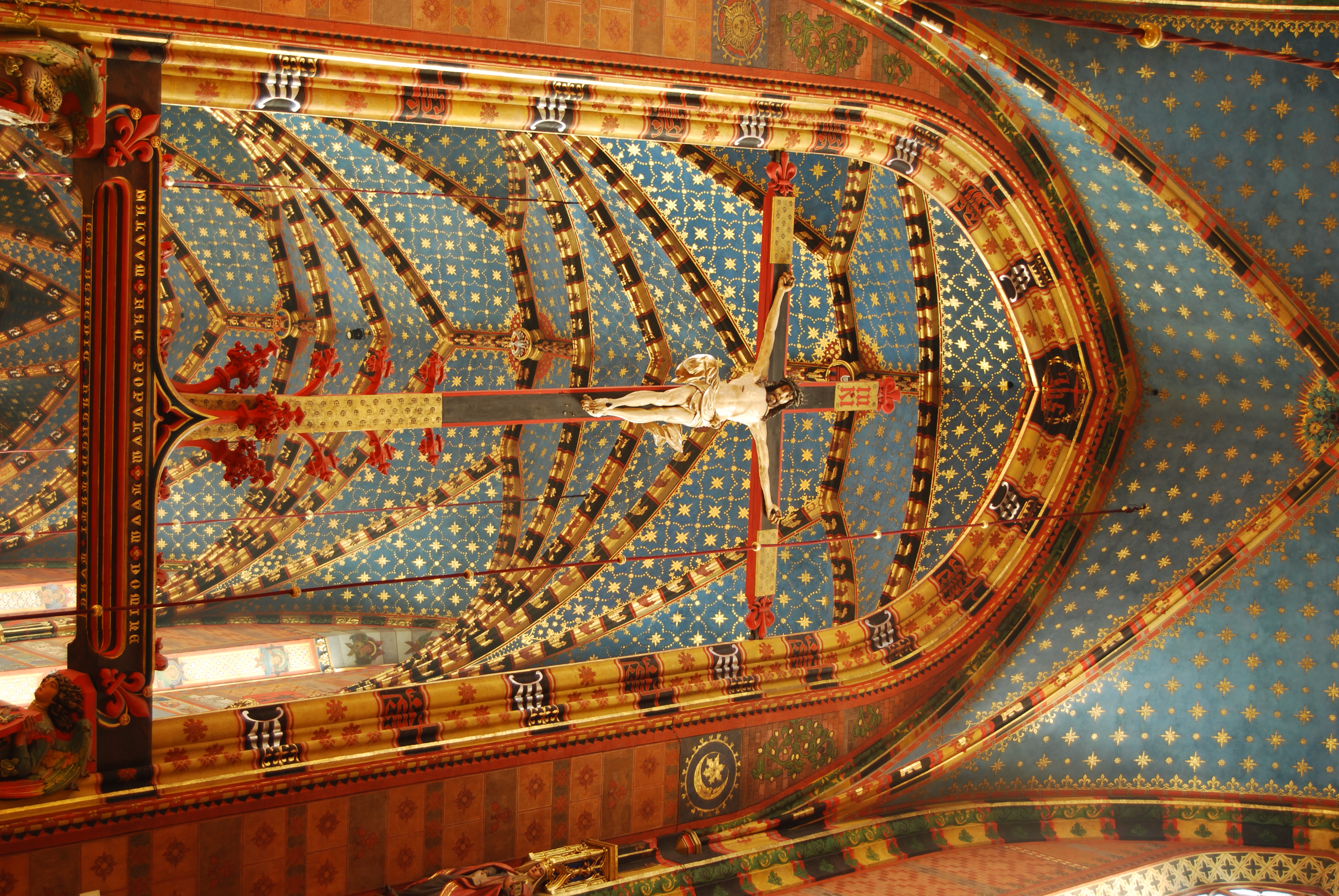
Chancel opening, cross

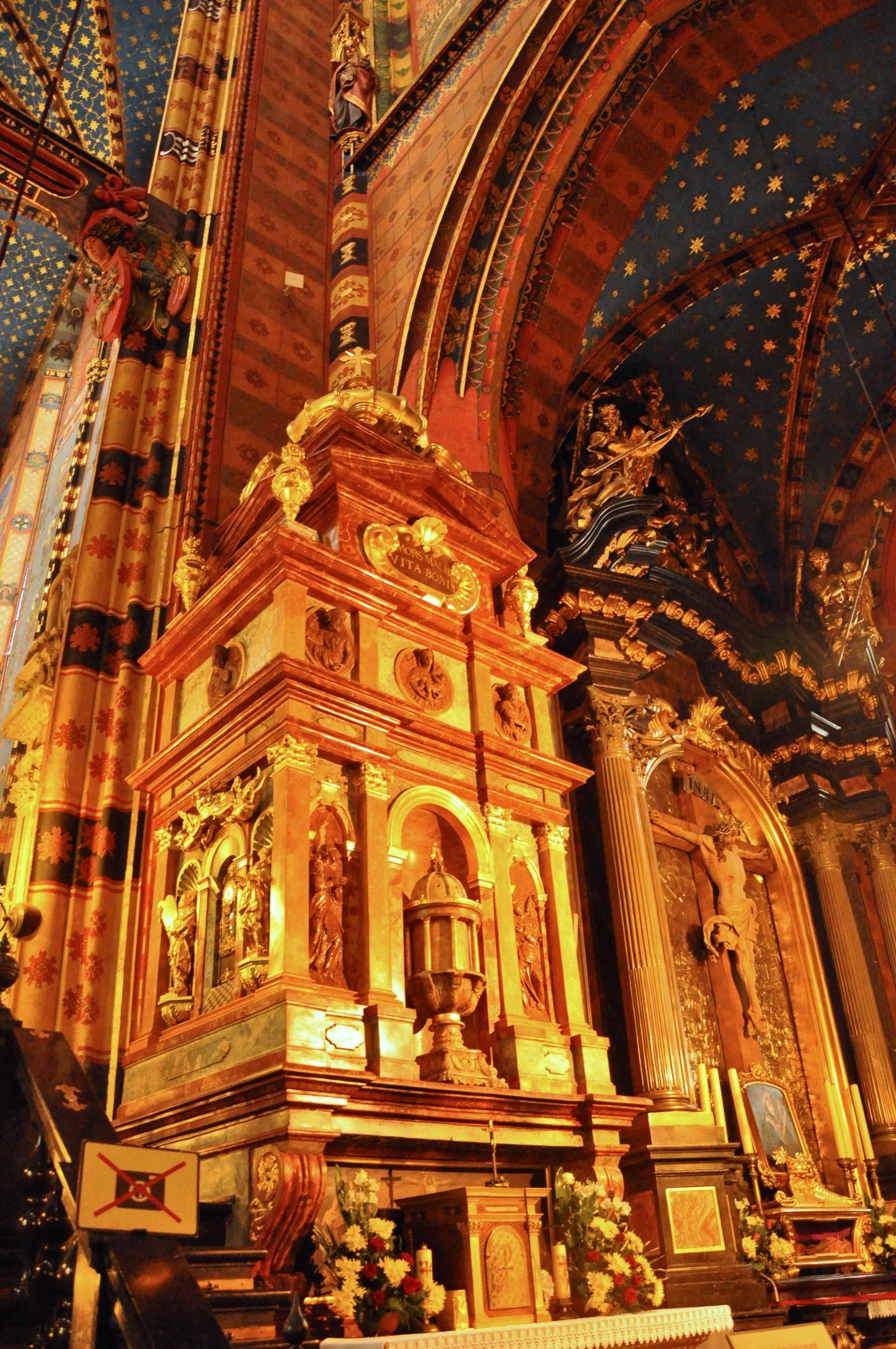
Ciborium by Giovanni Maria Mosca

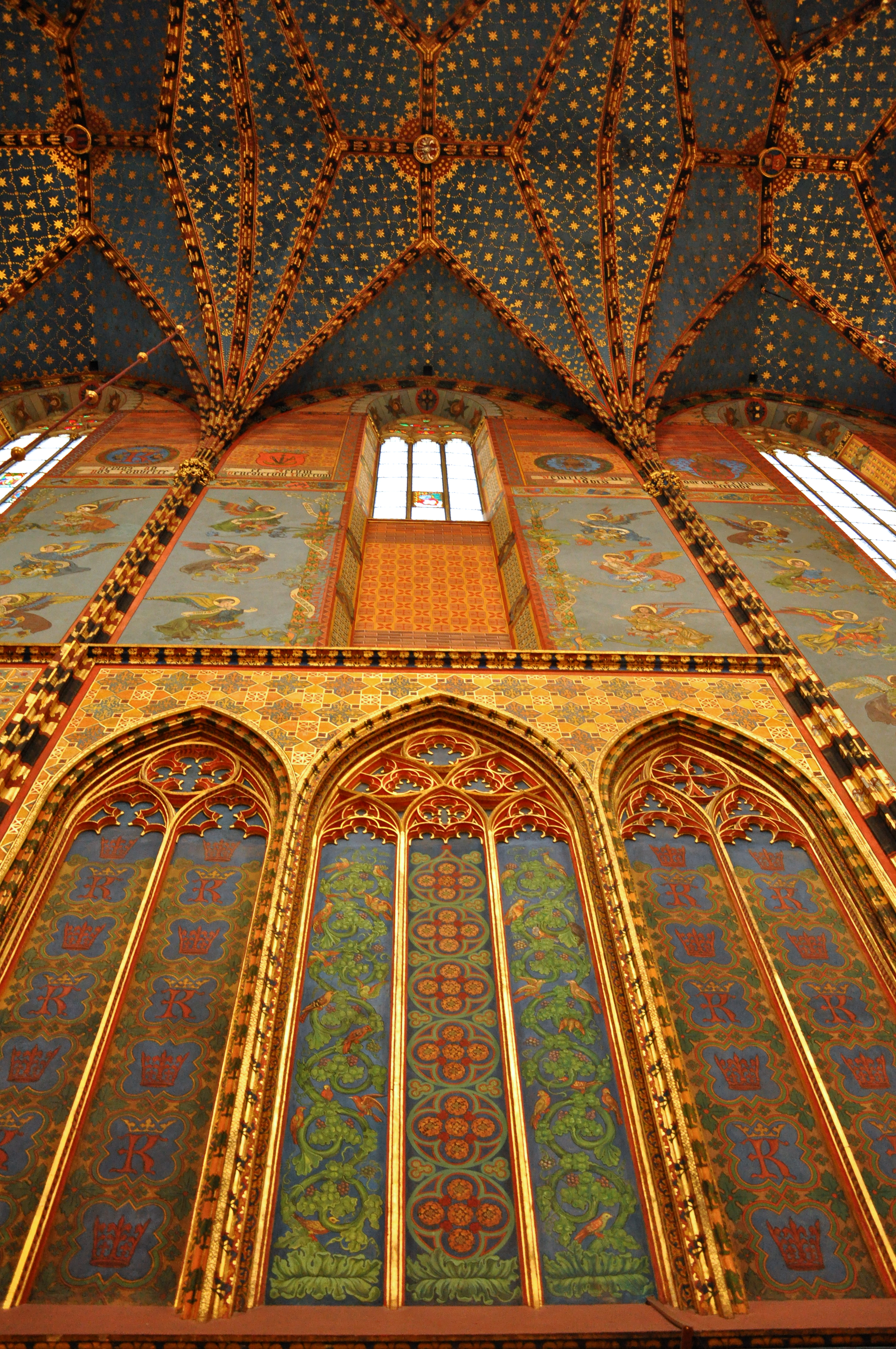
Polychromes by Matejko

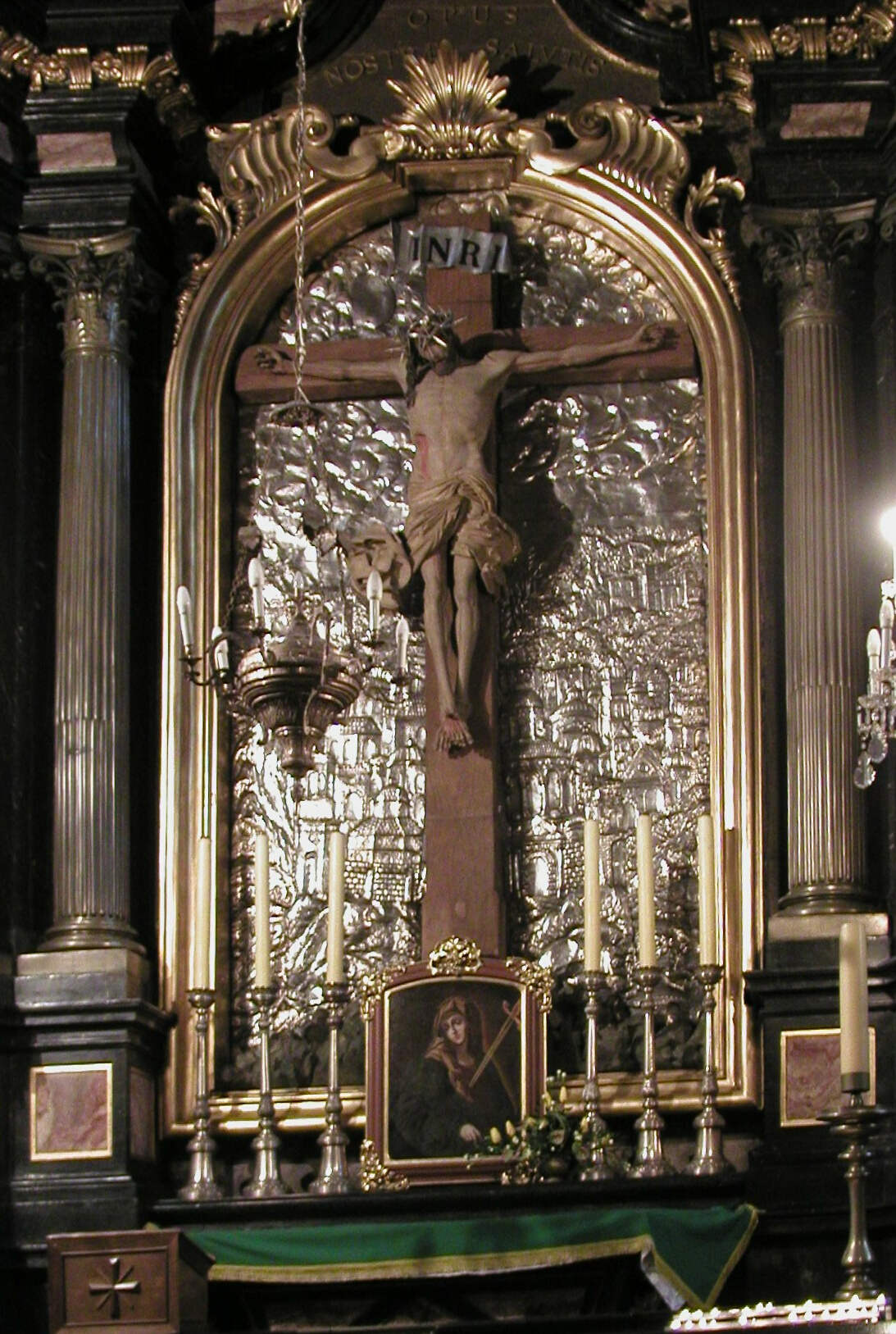
Crucifix by Veit Stoss, in the side altar

== See also ==
- Ołtarz Wita Stwosza (Altarpiece of Veit Stoss)
- Jan Matejko 19th-century design contribution
- Polish Cathedral style
- Roman Catholicism in Poland
- Roman Catholic Marian churches

== Bibliography ==
- (in Polish) * Michał Rożek, Barbara Gądkowa Leksykon kościołów Krakowa, Wydawnictwo Verso, Kraków 2003, ISBN 83-919281-0-1 pp 193-199 (Lexicon of Krakow churches)
- (in Polish) * Praca zbiorowa Encyklopedia Krakowa, wydawca Biblioteka Kraków i Muzeum Krakowa, Kraków 2023, ISBN 978-83-66253-46-9 volume I pp 722-724 (Encyclopedia of Krakow)
