= Sadie Rose Weilerstein =

American Jewish children's book writer

Sadie Rose Weilerstein (July 28, 1894 – June 23, 1993) was an American author of children's literature. Her works include What the Moon Brought and a series of stories featuring K'Tonton, a Jewish Tom Thumb. Rose Weilerstein was a Zionist, advocating for a Jewish homeland, and an environmentalist.

== Early life ==
Sadie Rose was born in Rochester, New York. Her parents Bernard and Tillie Rose were Jewish Lithuanian immigrants who kept a kosher home. They had emigrated to America about 10 years before she was born. In America, Bernard owned a factory, and Tillie was involved in Hadassah and the Women's Suffrage movement, working with Susan B. Anthony. Rose Weilerstein had three sisters and a brother.

After graduating from the University of Rochester, she was a teacher at the Rochester School for the Deaf. In 1920, she married B. Reuben Weilerstein, a rabbi, and the couple moved to Brooklyn for a time before settling in Atlantic City. The couple had a son and three daughters to whom she would tell stories.

== Literary career ==
Weilerstein's mother delivered samples of her writing to the publisher Bloch. Her first book, What Danny Did (1928) was published six months later to good reviews. In 1930, she published the first in a series of stories about K'tonton in the Jewish magazine Outlook. The stories are about a boy the size of a thumb who has adventures revolving around the Jewish holidays and culture. The K'Tonton stories "exemplified both Conservative Jewish and broadly humanistic values." In 1930, the stories were collected into a book, The Adventures of K'tonton, illustrated by Jeannette Berkowitz.

Dick: the Horse That Kept the Sabbath published in 1955 tells the story of a Jewish family living in the city whose horse, Dick, gets injured and is then taken to a Gentile family in the country where he will not have to walk on the hard pavement. The family promises to allow Dick to continue the Jewish practice of not working on the Sabbath.

In 1961 she published the story Ten and a Kid, inspired by her mother's stories of growing up in a Jewish shtetl in Lithuania and illustrated by Janina Domanska. Ten and a Kid was aimed at a slightly older audience of elementary school children. K'tonton in Israel presents Israel as "an old-new land existing in harmonious balance, where Bedouin hospitality evokes the open tent of the biblical patriarch Abraham while kibbutzniks make the desert bloom."

In 1976, she wrote another K'tonton book, K'tonton on an Island in the Sea which showcases her lifelong love of nature and growing interest in environmentalism. The book was illustrated by Mike Berenstain. Rose Weilerstein was part of the successful campaign to create Atlantic City's children's nature preserve.

Selected K'tonton stories were republished in a 50th anniversary collection called The Best of K'tonton in 1980 with new illustrations by Marilyn Hirsh. The Best Jewish Books for Children and Teens said that many of the stories seem "outdated" but tradition of American stories for children about Jewish holidays had "come into their own" through Weilerstein's K'tonton books and that the author and stories played a "central role in the literary heritage of American Jewish children." In the 1990s, several of the K'tonton stories from the collections were published as stand-alone nursery books.

== Selected works ==
- What Danny Did: Stories for the Wee Jewish Child, illustrated by Sol Aronson (1928) – also illus. Jeanette Berkowitz Robinson (1944)
- The Adventures of K'tonton: A Little Jewish Tom Thumb , illus. Jeannette Berkowitz (1930)
- What the Moon Brought, illus. Mathilda Keller (1942)
- Little New Angel, Mathilda Keller (1947)
- Molly and the Sabbath Queen, Anne Ferril Folsom (1949)
- Dick: The Horse That Kept the Sabbath, Jessie B. Robinson (1955)
- Ten and a Kid, Janina Domanska (1961)
- K'tonton in Israel, Elizabeth Safian (1964)
- K'tonton On an Island in the Sea: A Hitherto Unreported Episode in the Life of the Jewish Thumbling [...], Michael Berenstain (1976)

== Awards and recognition ==
- 1962: National Jewish Book Award for Ten and a Kid
- Yovel Award of the National Women's League of the United Synagogue of America
