= Church of Our Lady of the Snows, Kraków =

Roman Catholic church in Kraków, Poland

Church of Our Lady of the Snows
- Kościół Matki Boskiej Śnieżnej
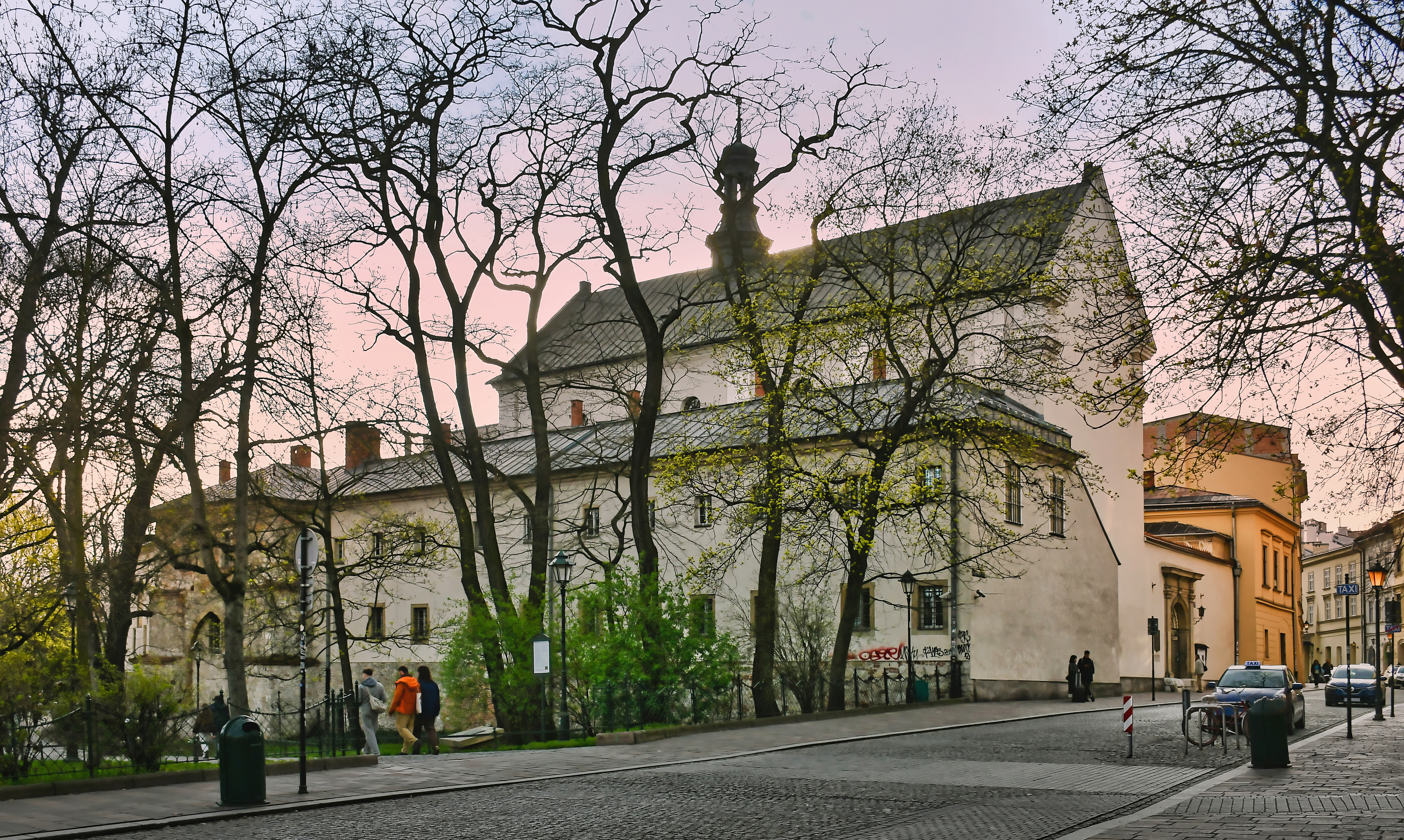
- Church and Dominican Sisters monastery view from Planty Park
- Church of Our Lady of the Snows
- 50°03′39.7″N 19°56′35.5″E
- Location: Kraków
- Address: 21 Mikołajska Street
- Country: Poland
- Denomination: Roman Catholic
- Website: https://grodek.mniszki.dominikanie.pl/historia/

UNESCO World Heritage Site
- Type: Cultural
- Criteria: iv
- Designated: 1978
- Part of: Historic Centre of Kraków
- Reference no.: 29
- Region: Europe and North America

Historic Monument of Poland
- Designated: 1994-09-08
- Part of: Kraków historical city complex
- Reference no.: M.P. 1994 nr 50 poz. 418

The Church of Our Lady of the Snows (Polish: Kościół Matki Boskiej Śnieżnej), known colloquially as the Dominican Sisters Church (Polish: Kościół dominikanek) and Na Gródku Church (Polish: Kościół Na Gródku) is a historic Roman Catholic parish and conventual church of the Dominican Sisters located at 21 Mikołajska Street in Old Town of Kraków, Poland.

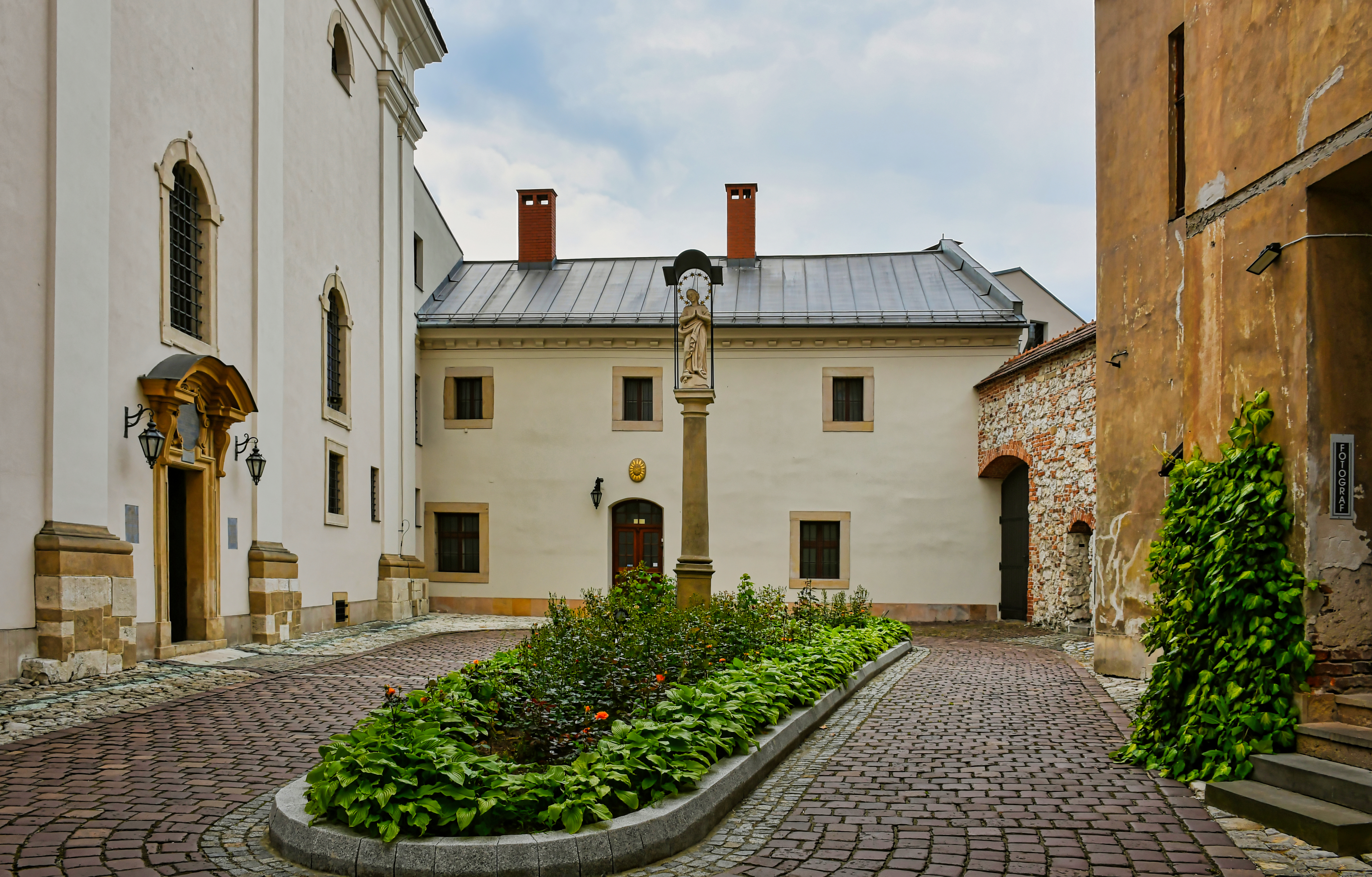
The courtyard and the entrances to the church and the monastery

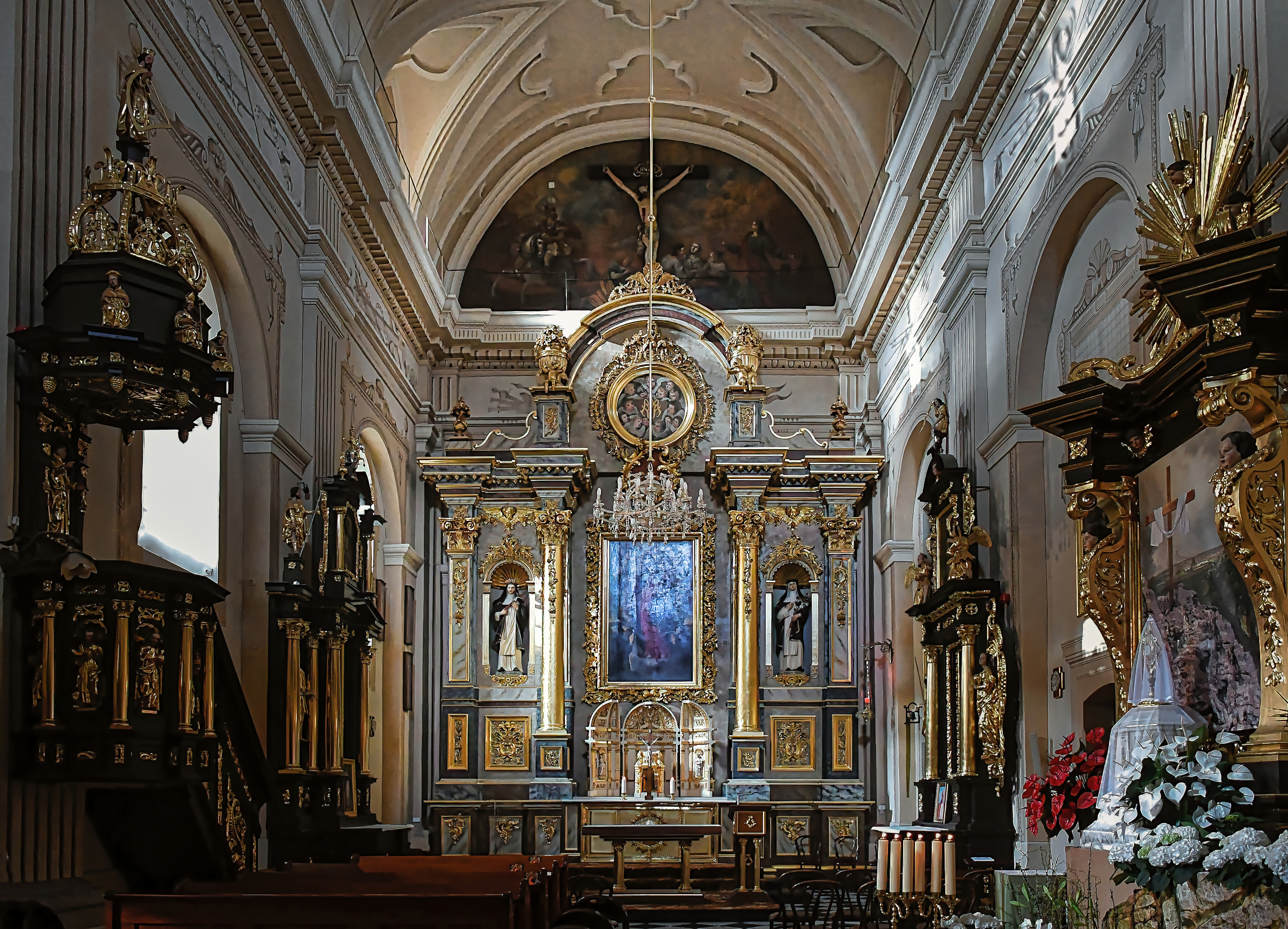
Interior of the church

== Bibliography ==
- (in Polish) Michał Rożek, Barbara Gądkowa Leksykon kościołów Krakowa, Wydawnictwo Verso, Kraków 2003, ISBN 83-919281-0-1 pp. 105–106 (Lexicon of Kraków churches)
- (in Polish) Praca zbiorowa Encyklopedia Krakowa, wydawca Biblioteka Kraków i Muzeum Krakowa, Kraków 2023, ISBN 978-83-66253-46-9 volume I page 747 (Encyclopedia of Kraków)
