= Eric P. Kelly =

American writer

- Born: March 16, 1884; Amesbury, Massachusetts, U.S.
- Died: January 3, 1960 (aged 75)
- Occupations: Journalist, teacher
- Writing career
- Period: 20th century
- Genre: Juvenile fiction

Eric Philbrook Kelly (March 16, 1884 – January 3, 1960) was an American journalist, academic and author of children's books. He was a professor of English at Dartmouth College and briefly a lecturer at the Jagiellonian University in Kraków. He won the 1929 Newbery Medal recognizing his first published book, The Trumpeter of Krakow, as the preceding year's most distinguished contribution to American children's literature.

== Life ==
Kelly was born in 1884 in Amesbury, Massachusetts. Kelly graduated Dartmouth College in 1906 (BA). As a student, Kelly was a member of the French club and one of the first members of The Pukwana Club, which would eventually transition into the Delta Beta chapter of the Sigma Nu fraternity.

After "ten colorless, uneventful, and discouraging years working on newspapers", Kelly volunteered in 1918 to work with the welfare organisation Les Foyers du Soldat in Quentin, France. He found himself in charge of athletics and entertainment for 2,000 Polish soldiers in Haller's Army. In May 1919, Kelly was shipped across Germany to the newly recognised state of Poland in a closed boxcar along with the Polish troops. His new base was established in the old Napoleonic fortress of Modlin, near Warsaw. He wrote to his mother that "Warsaw is a beautiful city, reminds me in some ways of Denver."

During the 1919–1920 Polish–Soviet War, Kelly was posted at Chełm with Haller's Army on the Bug River. In January 1921, Kelly returned to the US where he took a job as a teacher at Mercersburg Academy. During this period he wrote descriptions of his experience in Poland and warned against the dangers of Bolshevik propaganda. Six months later, he was hired by his alma mater, Dartmouth College, where he would teach for 33 years. In 1924, he married his wife Katherine but, in spite of his fame as a children’s author, did not have any children of his own.

1925–1926 Kelly went to the Jagiellonian University in Kraków as the first American exchange scholar sent to Poland by the Kosciuszko Foundation. Kelly served as an instructor of American Literature and Institutions in the Department of English Philology under Prof. Roman Dybowski.

On 4 July 1926, Kelly ceremonially placed a vase filled with earth from Tadeusz Kościuszko's North American battlefields at Yorktown and Saratoga in the Kościuszko Mound overlooking Kraków. That same year, he started work on The Trumpeter of Krakow which won the Newbery Medal for Children's literature in 1929. This novel contains the first known reference in any language to the now-popular legend of the hejnał trumpeter shot by a Tartar arrow.

Kelly spent 1930 as a researcher in Vilnius and 1931 in Lviv (both in Polish hands at that time). These inspired further Polish-themed children’s books: The Blacksmith of Vilno and The Golden Star of Halicz. His 1932 book, The Christmas Nightingale, was adapted as a play in 1935.

In 1943–1945, Kelly worked for the US State Department taking care of Polish refugees in León, Guanajuato, Mexico.

Kelly was chairman of the Pulitzer Prize selection committee for the novel in the years 1951, 1952 and 1953. He retired from teaching in 1954, and retired to Chebeague Island, Maine, and Ojo Caliente, New Mexico.

== Books ==
- The Trumpeter of Krakow (1928)
- The Blacksmith of Vilno (1930)
- The Golden Star of Halicz (1931)
- Christmas Nightingale (1932)
- The Girl Who Would be Queen (1934)
- Three Sides of Angiochook (1935)
- Treasure Mountain (1937)
- At the Sign of the Golden Compass (1938)
- On the Staked Plain (1940)
- From Star to Star (1940)
- In Clean Hay (1940)
- Land of the Polish People (1943)
- The Hand in the Picture (1947)
- The Amazing Story of David Ingram (1949)
- Polish Legends and Tales (1971)

Awards
Preceded by Dhan Gopal Mukerji	Newbery Medal winner 1929	Succeeded by Rachel Field
