= Tadeusz Pawlikowski Street =

Street in Kraków, Poland

Tadeusz Pawlikowski street
Kraków
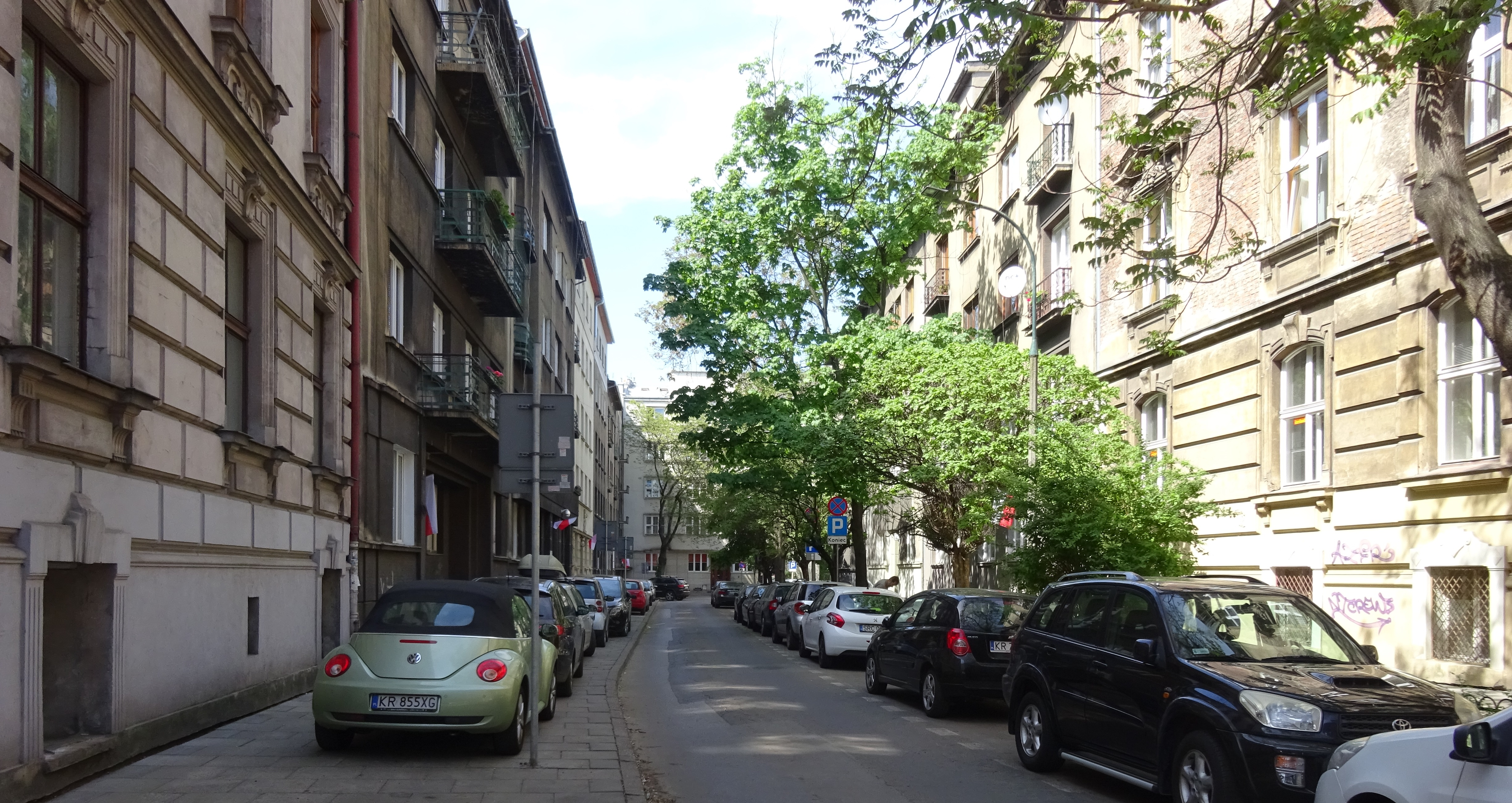
- View in the north-western direction
- Interactive map of Tadeusz Pawlikowski street
- Part of: Kraków Old Town
- Owner: City of Kraków
- Location: Kraków, Poland

Tadeusz Pawlikowski Street in Kraków is a street in Kraków, in District I Old Town, in Piasek. It is 132 meters long.

== History ==
The street was laid out in the 1930s. Initially, it was named Ambroży Grabowski Side Street, and in 1951, the Kraków City Council named it after Tadeusz Pawlikowski, a Polish theater director and manager.

The numbering of buildings starts from the intersection with Ambroży Grabowski Street. The street is a dead end and measures approximately 130 meters in length.

In 2022, a plaque commemorating Adam Zagajewski, who lived here from 2002 to 2021, was placed on the facade of the tenement at Tadeusz Pawlikowski 7. The plaque was unveiled by his wife, Maja Zagajewska. The ceremony was attended by the then Mayor of Kraków, Jacek Majchrowski.

== Buildings ==
The buildings along the street are modernist rental tenements. Tenement No. 16 was designed by one of the few female architects in interwar Poland, Diana Reiterówna.

On the even side:

- 4 Tadeusz Pawlikowski Street – tenement house, built in 1938 according to a design by Ignacy Bierer.
- 6 Tadeusz Pawlikowski Street – tenement house, built in 1938 according to a design by Izydor Goldberger.
- 8 Tadeusz Pawlikowski Street – tenement house, built in 1938 according to a design by Samuel Wexner and Henryk Jakubowicz.
- 10 Tadeusz Pawlikowski Street– tenement house, built in 1938 according to a design by Henryk Jakubowicz and Samuel Wexner.
- 12 Tadeusz Pawlikowski Street – tenement house, built in 1938 according to a design by Samuel Manber.
- 16 Tadeusz Pawlikowski Street – tenement house, built in 1938 according to a design by Diana Reiter.

On the odd side of the street:

- 3 Tadeusz Pawlikowski Street – tenement house, built in 1938 according to a design by P. Zdybalski and Ignacy Bierer.
- 5 Tadeusz Pawlikowski Street – tenement house, built in 1939 according to a design by Stefan Żeleński.
- 7 Tadeusz Pawlikowski Street – tenement house, built in 1939 according to a design by Samuel Singer.
- 9 Tadeusz Pawlikowski Street – tenement house, built in 1938 according to a design by Alfred Düntuch and Stefan Landsberger.
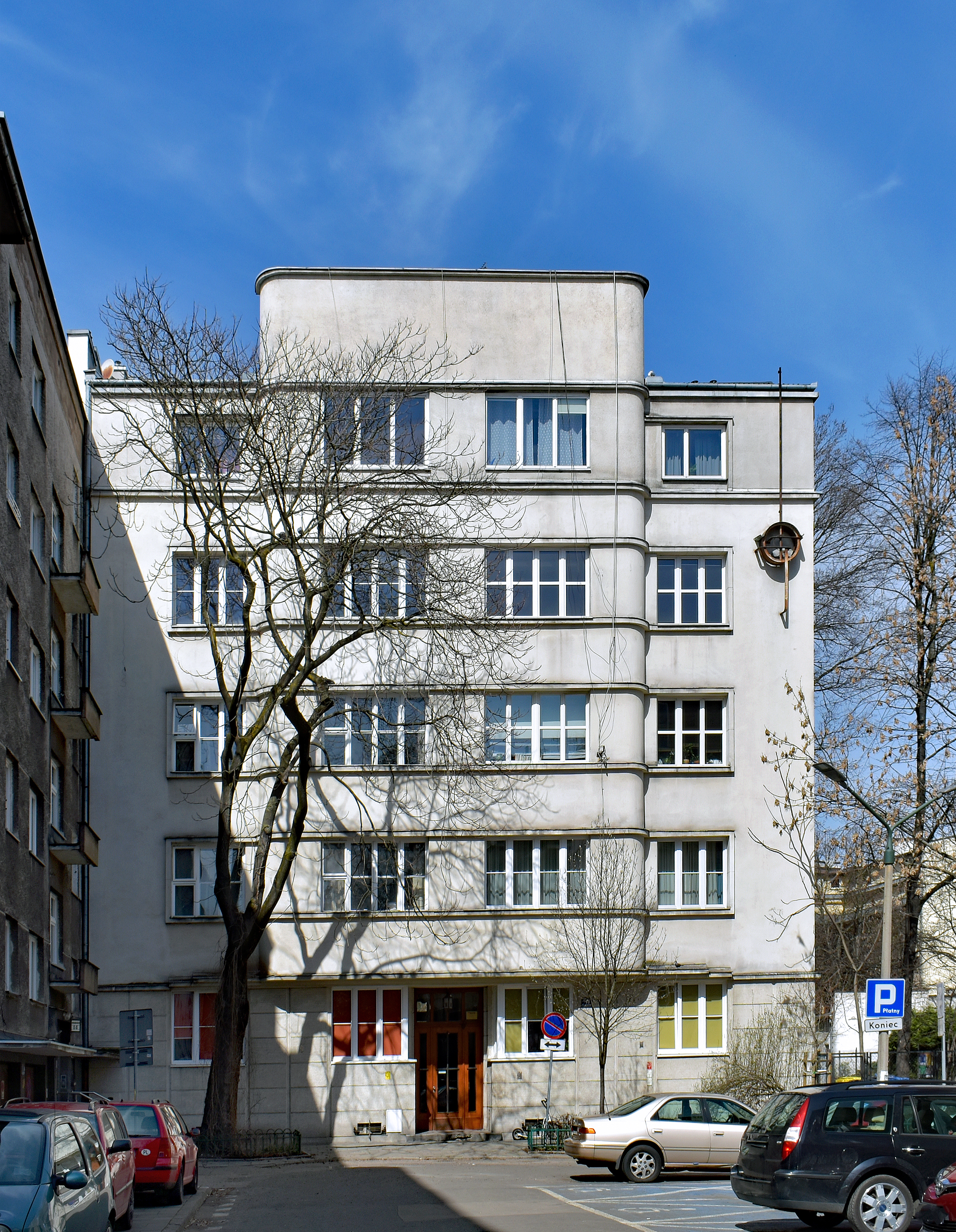
16 Tadeusz Pawlikowski Street (design. Diana Reiter, 1938)
