= Ambroży Grabowski Street =

Street in Kraków, Poland

Ambroży Grabowski street
Kraków
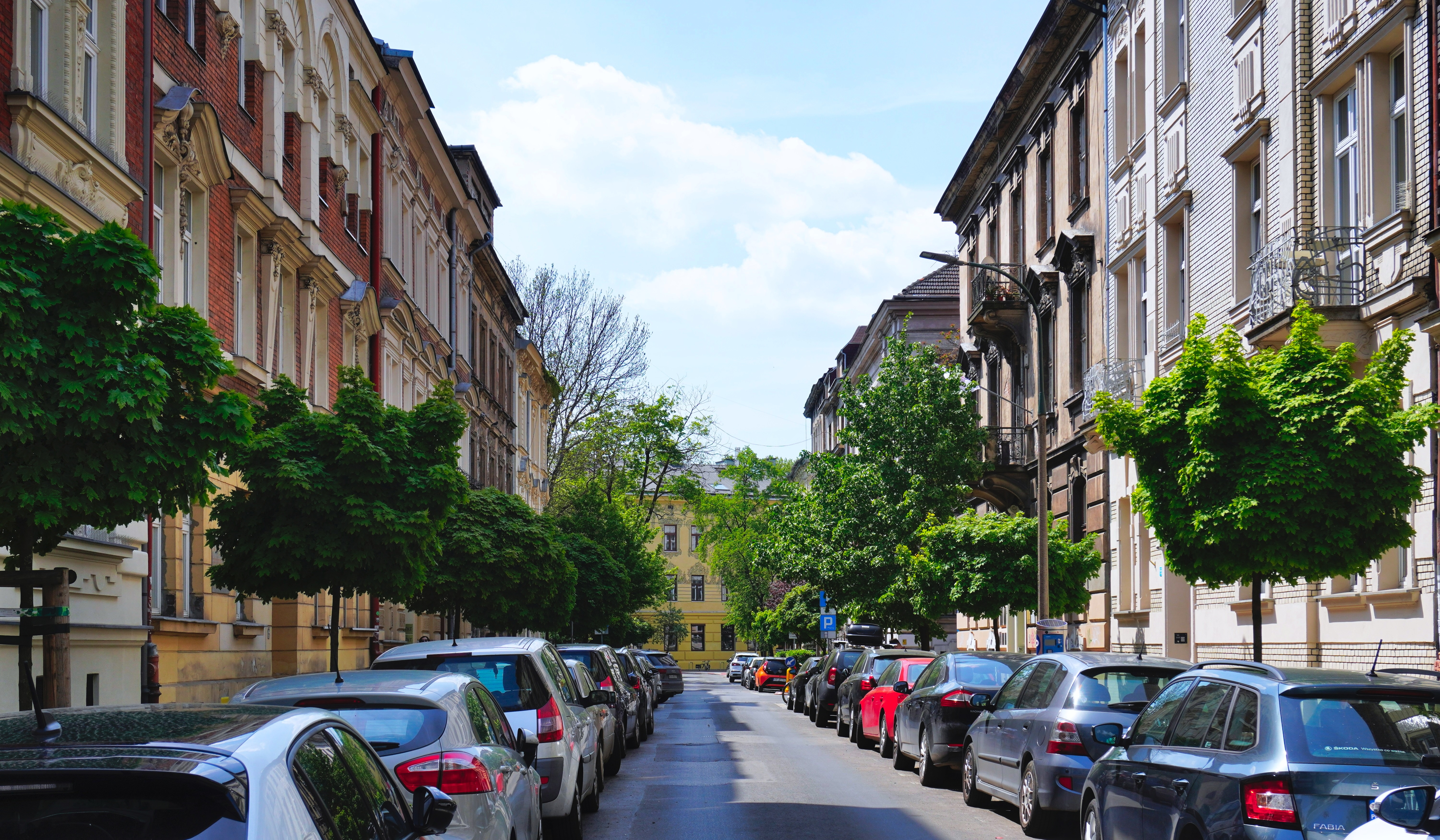
- View of the street
- Interactive map of Ambroży Grabowski street
- Part of: Kraków Old Town district
- Owner: City of Kraków
- Location: Kraków, Poland

Ambroży Grabowski Street in Kraków is a street in Kraków, in District I Old Town, in Piasek. It runs from Karmelicka Street in a south-westerly direction to Jan Kochanowski Street.

The street was laid out at the beginning of the 20th century. For a short time, it was referred to as Bogata Street. Its current name, honoring the Krakow historian and bookseller Ambroży Grabowski, was given in 1903.

At the intersection with Ambroży Grabowski Street, Tadeusz Pawlikowski Street begins its course.

== Buildings ==
In the 19th century, in the area where Ambroży Grabowski Street was later laid out, there was a manor house with a garden owned by Jan Wańkowicz, a January Uprising insurgent and friend of Romuald Traugutt. The current development of the street is residential in character, consisting of tenement houses built in the 1890s and early 20th century.

- 1 Ambroży Grabowski Street (52 Karmelicka Street) – Tenement house. Designed by Beniamin Torbe (?), 1906.
- 2 Ambroży Grabowski Street (50 Karmelicka Street) – Tenement house. Designed by Aleksander Biborski (?), 1905.
- 3 Ambroży Grabowski Street – Tenement house in the Art Nouveau style. Designed by Beniamin Torbe, 1905.
- 4 Ambroży Grabowski Street – Tenement house in the historicist style. Designed by Józef Hercok, 1900.
- 5 Ambroży Grabowski Street (1 Tadeusz Pawlikowski Street) – Tenement house. Designed by Józef Pakies, 1905.
- 6 Ambroży Grabowski Street – Tenement house in the historicist style. Designed by Henryk Lamensdorf, 1906.
- 7 Ambroży Grabowski Street (2 Tadeusz Pawlikowski Street) – Tenement house. Designed by Józef Pakies, 1905.
- 8 Ambroży Grabowski Street – Tenement house. Designed by Franciszek Mączyński, construction supervised by Aleksander Biborski, 1902.
- 9 Ambroży Grabowski Street – Tenement house. Designed by Henryk Lamensdorf, 1910–1912.
- 10 Ambroży Grabowski Street – Tenement house in the historicist style. Built in 1899.
- 12 Ambroży Grabowski Street (15 Jan Kochanowski Street) – A freestanding villa with Art Nouveau facade decorations, surrounded by a garden.
- 13 Ambroży Grabowski Street (17 Jan Kochanowski Street) – Tenement house in the historicist style.
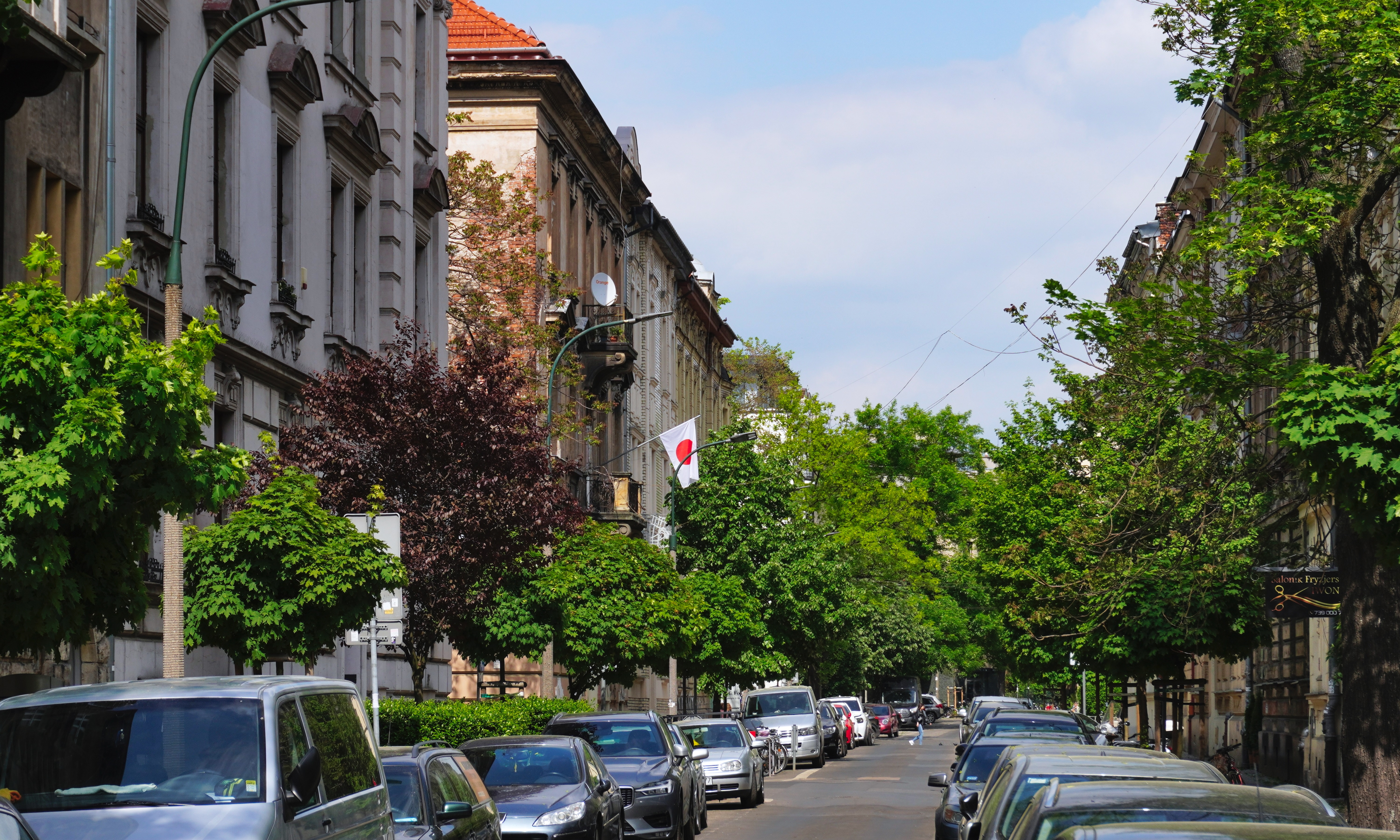
View to the northeast, from Jan Kochanowski Street

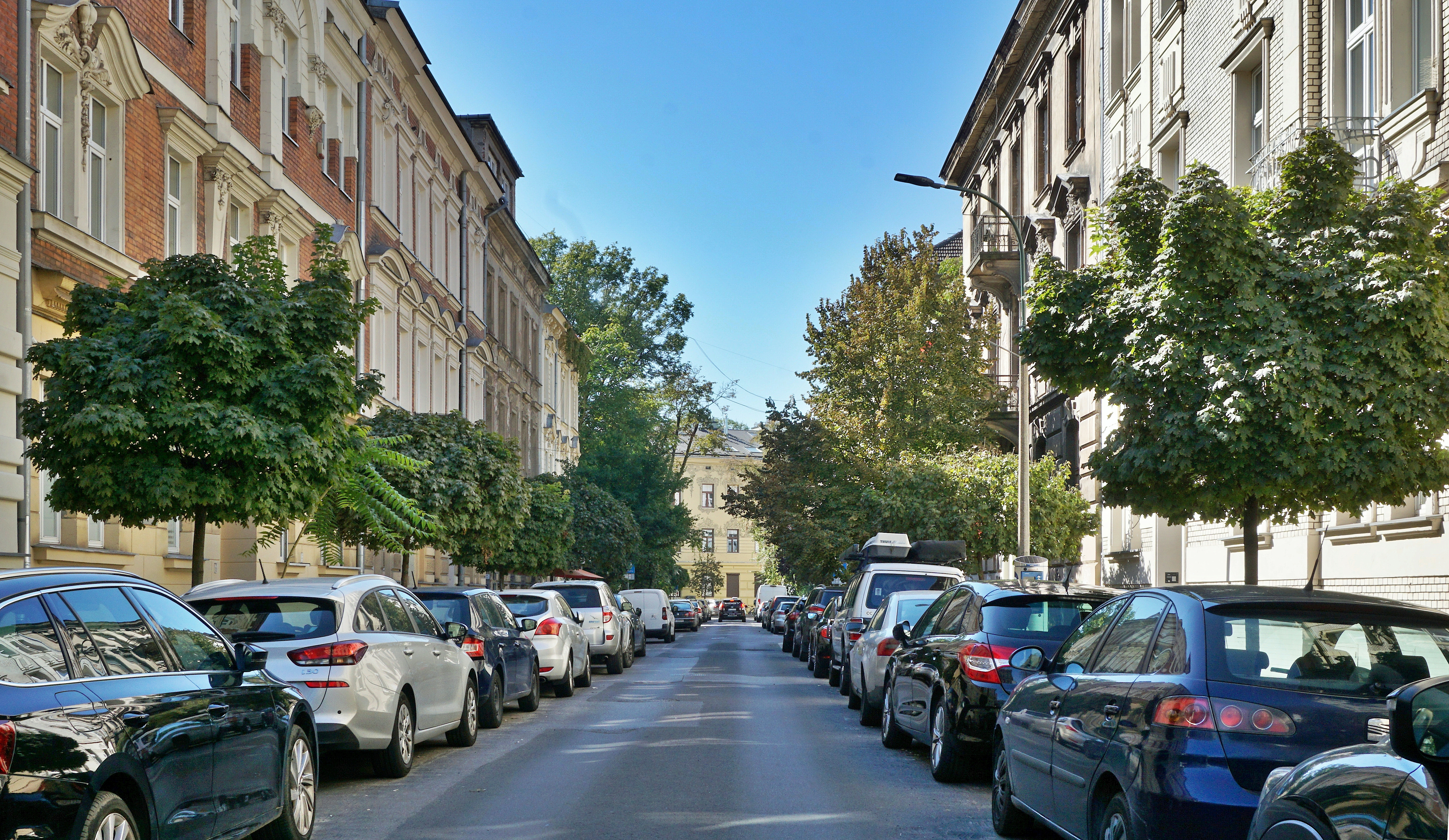
View to the southwest (2024)

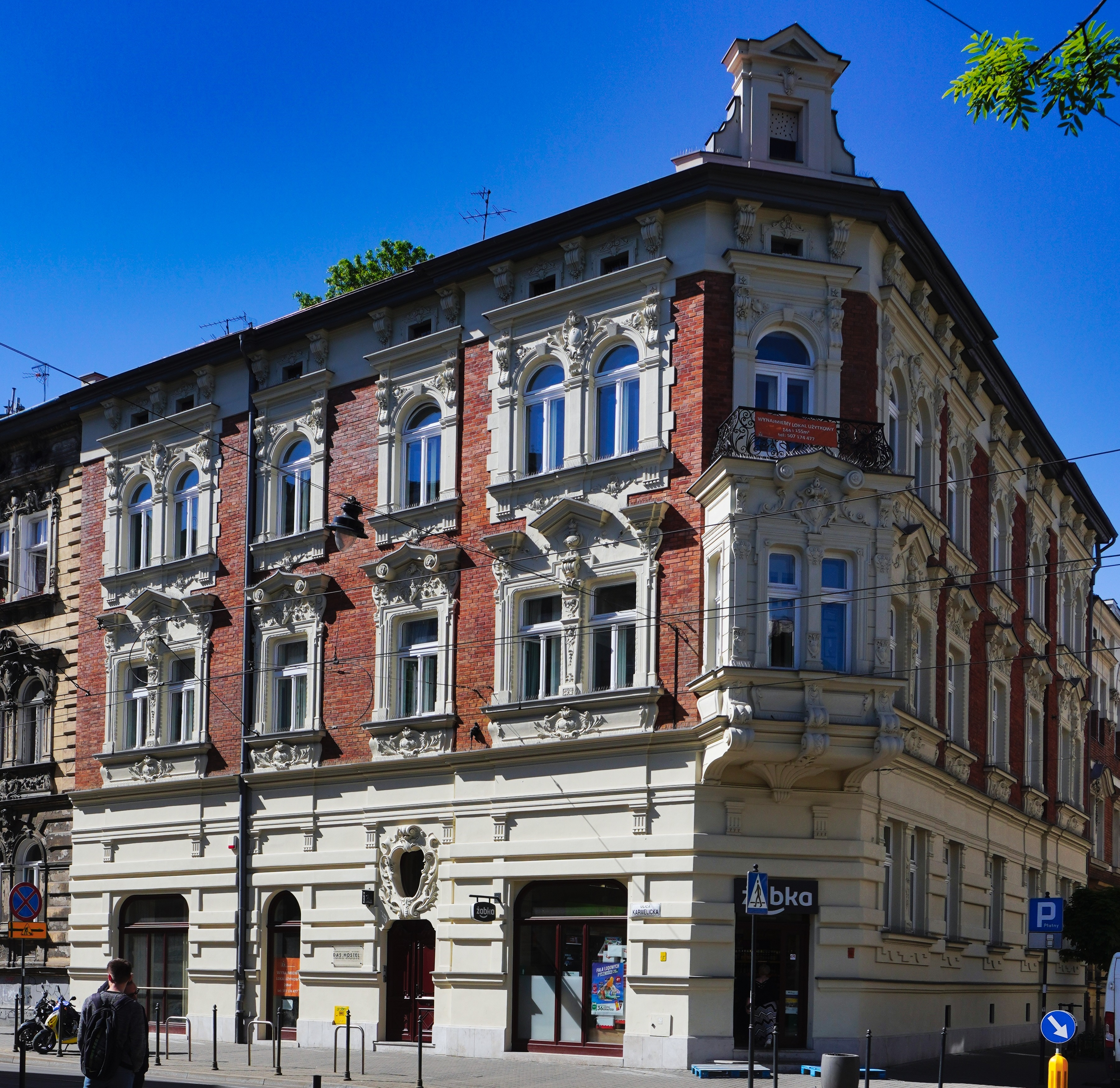
2 Ambroży Grabowski Street (50 Karmelicka Street)
Tenement house (design. Aleksander Biborski (?), 1905)

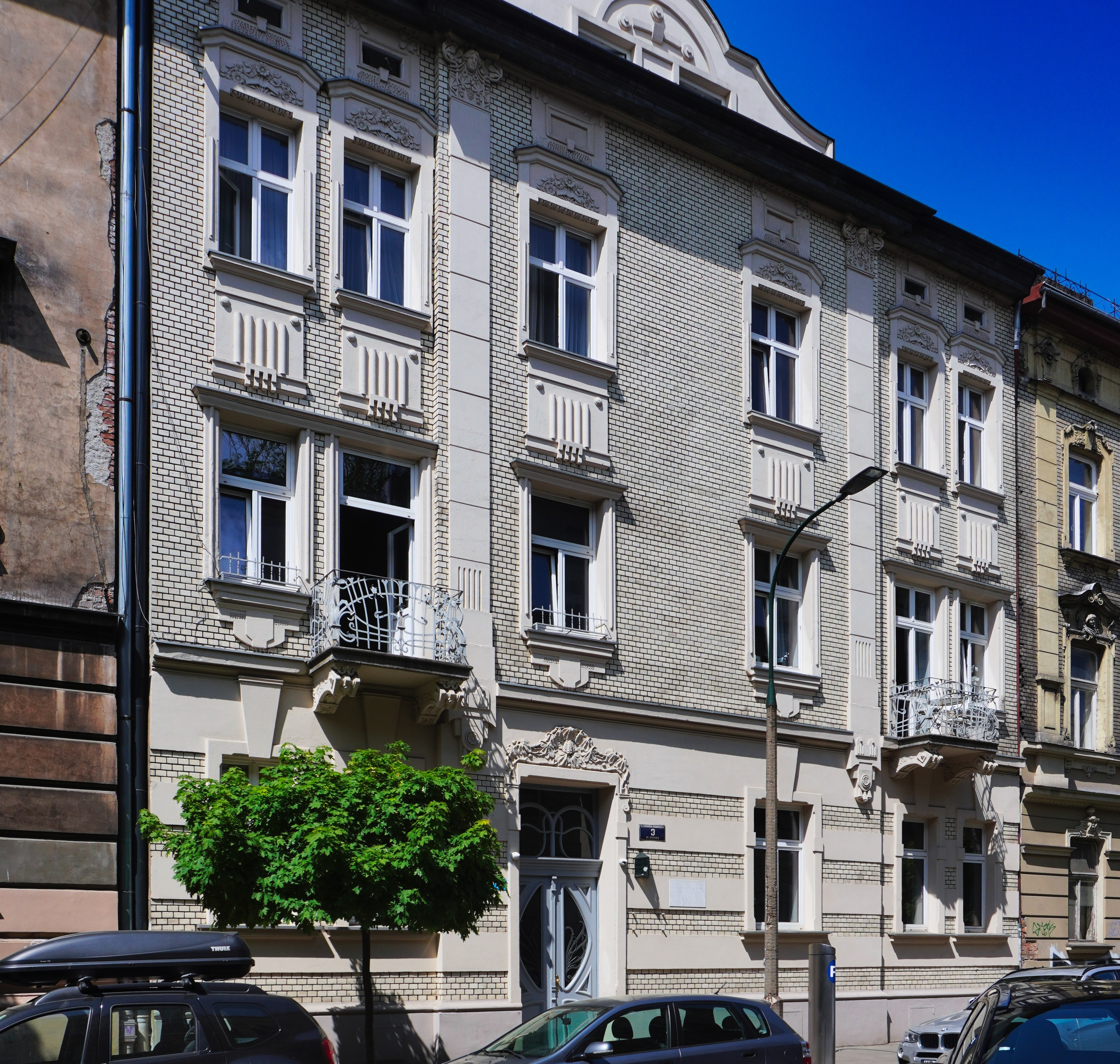
3 Ambroży Grabowski Street
Tenement house (design. Beniamin Torbe, 1905)

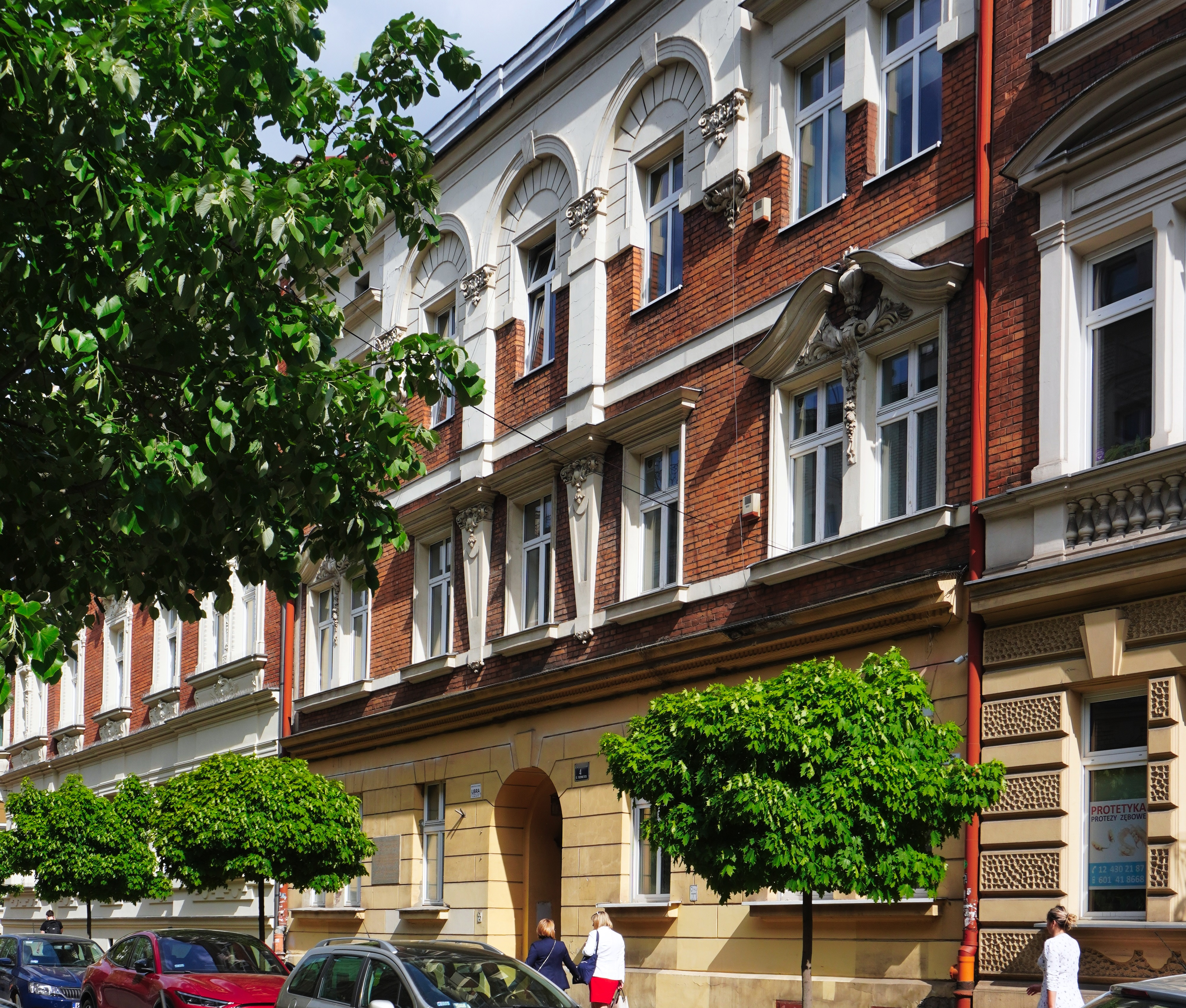
4 Ambroży Grabowski Street
Tenement house (design. Józef Hercok, 1900)

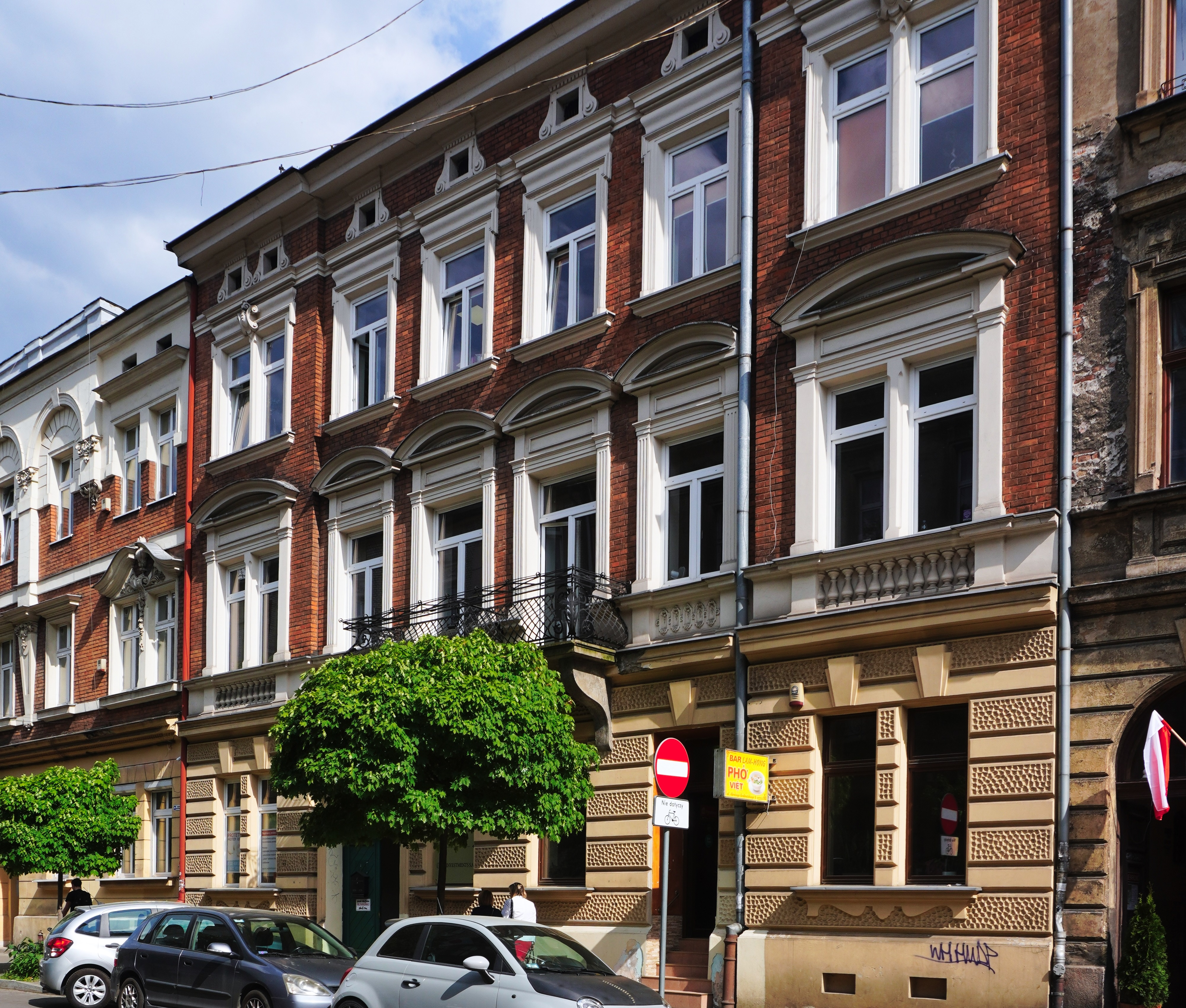
6 Ambroży Grabowski Street
Tenement house (design. Henryk Lamensdorf, 1899)

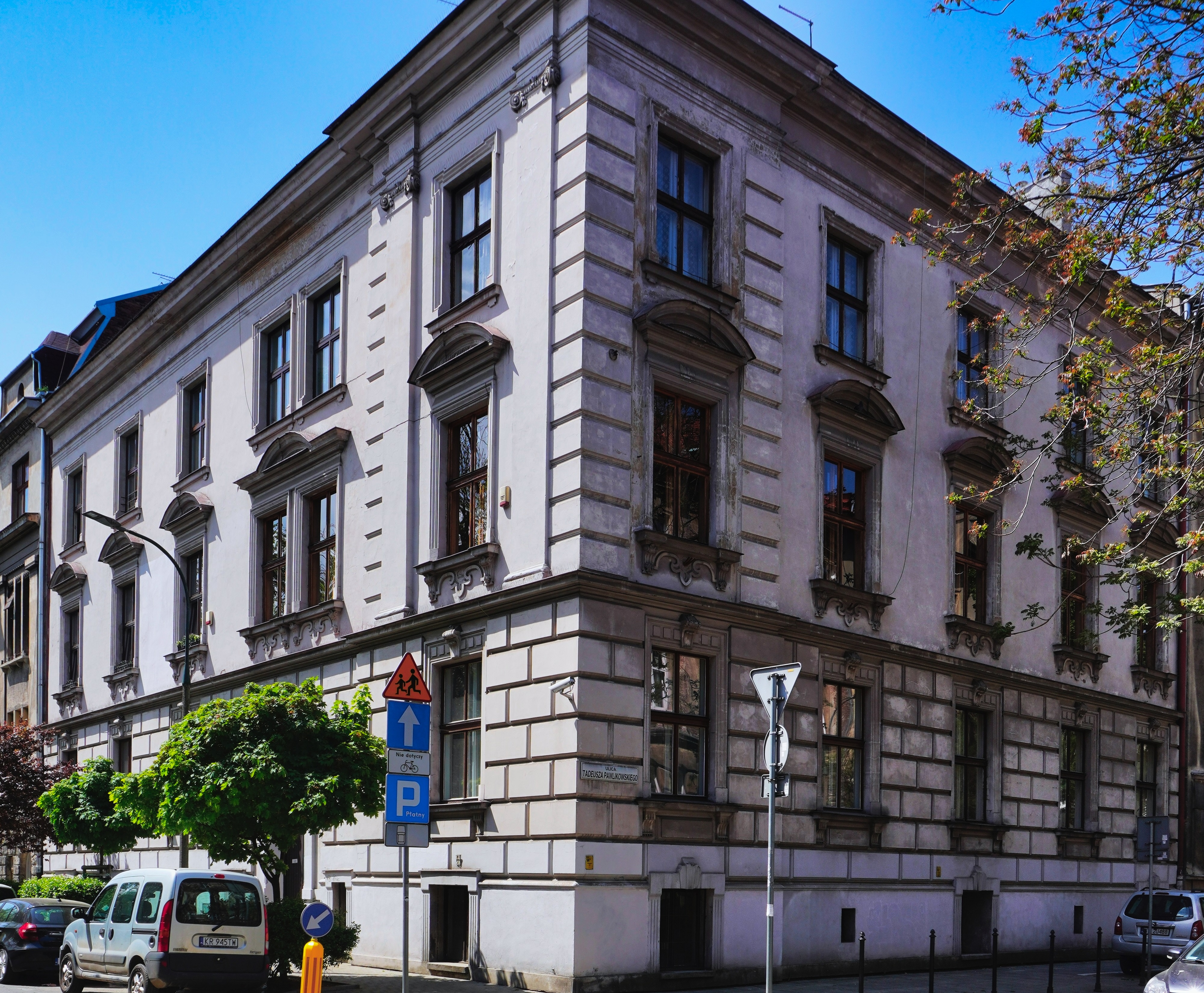
7 Ambroży Grabowski Street (2 Tadeusz Pawlikowski Street)
Tenement house (design. Józef Pakies, 1905)

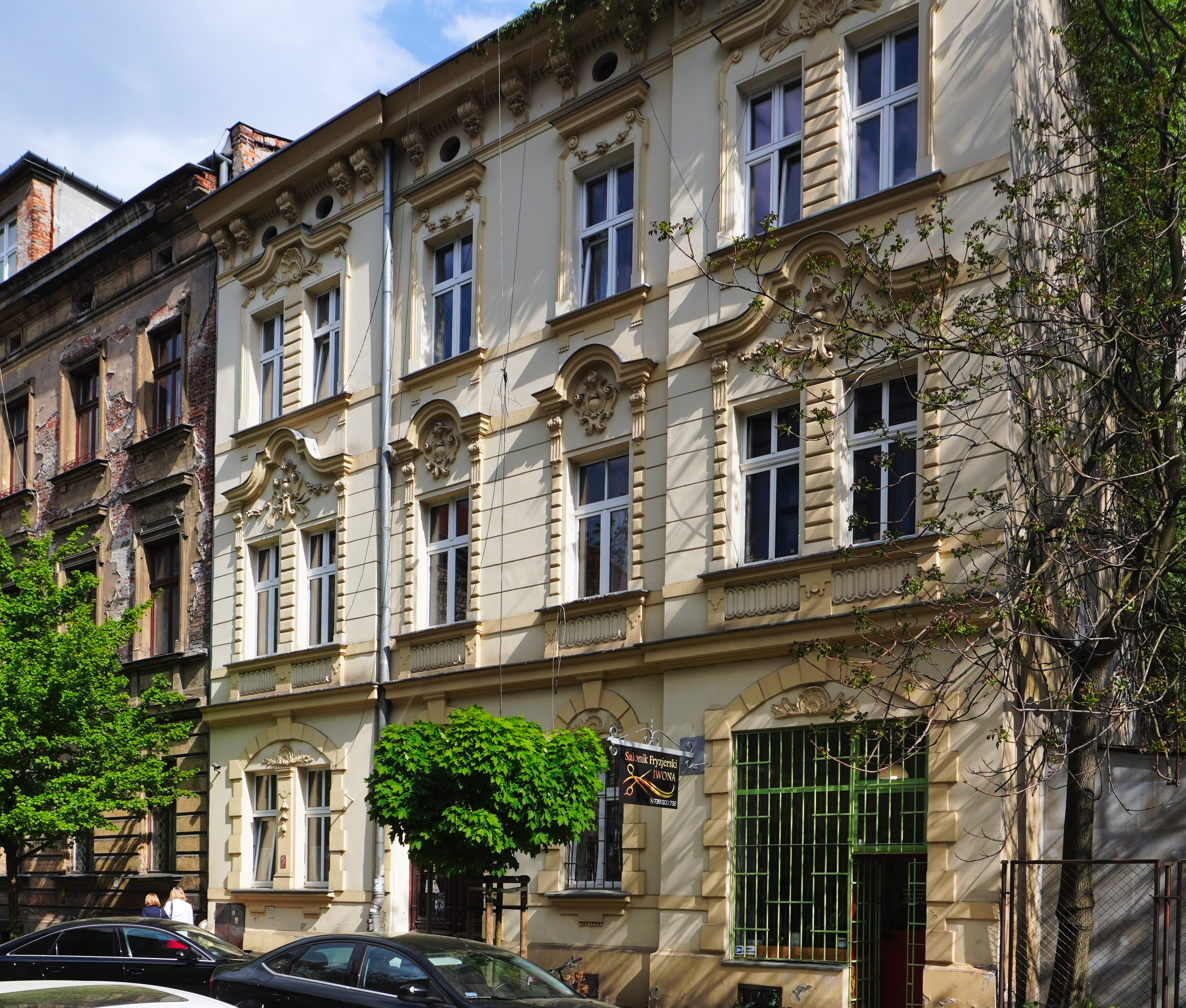
10 Ambroży Grabowski Street
Tenement house (1899)

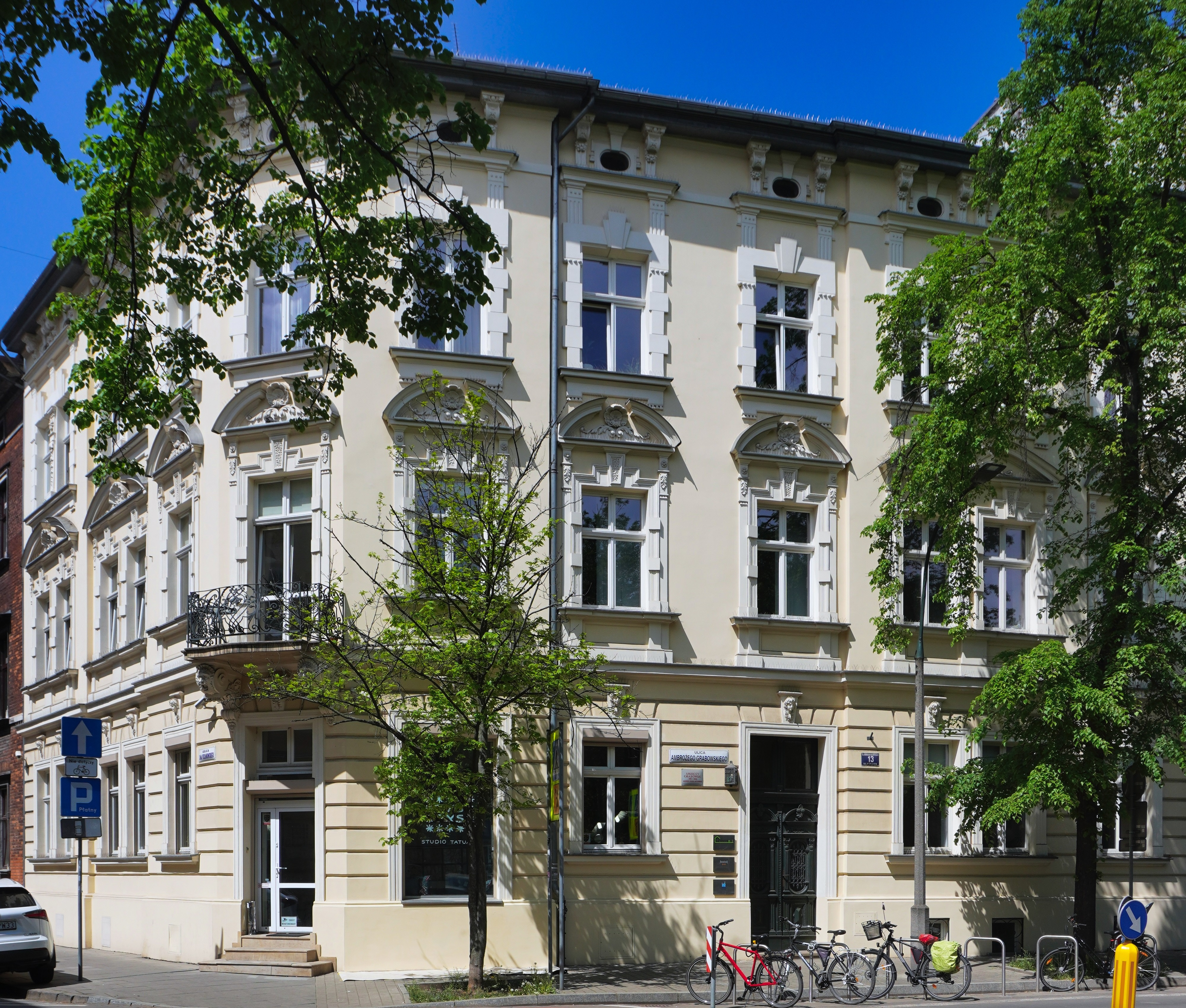
13 Ambroży Grabowski Street (17 Jan Kochanowski Street)
Tenement house
