= Jan Kochanowski Street =

Street in Kraków, Poland

Jan Kochanowski street
Kraków
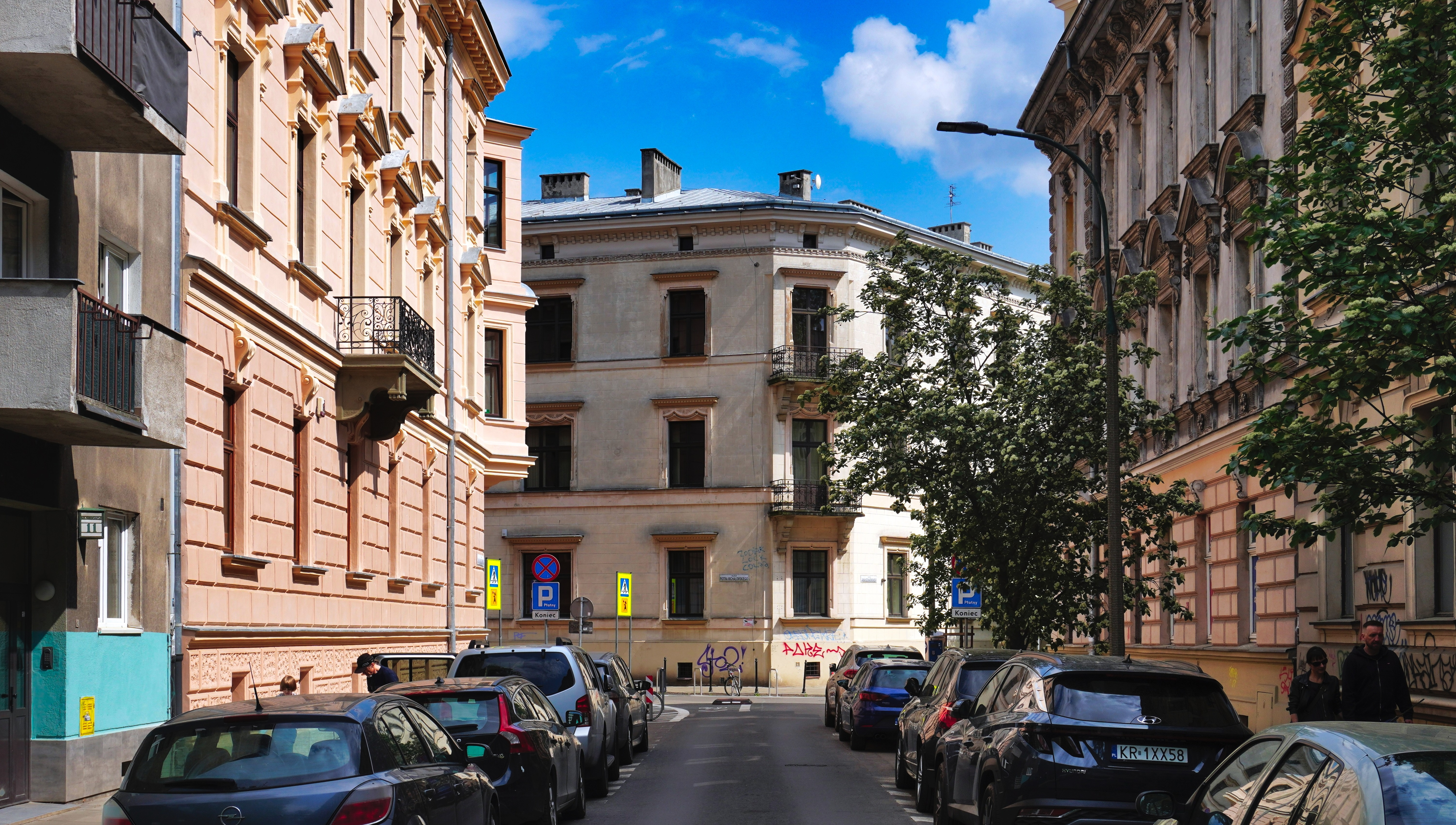
- View of the street
- Interactive map of Jan Kochanowski street
- Part of: Kraków Old Town district
- Owner: City of Kraków
- Location: Kraków, Poland

Jan Kochanowski Street in Kraków is a street in Kraków, in Kraków Old Town, in Piasek. It begins its course blindly in the area of the wall of the former infantry barracks' exercise square and leads to Adam Mickiewicz Avenue.

== History ==
The street was laid out in the second half of the 19th century on land belonging to S. Stachowski. Initially, it was named after him. The current name was assigned in 1912. At the beginning of the 20th century, in the context of incorporating the neighboring villages of Czarna Wieś and Nowa Wieś into Kraków and undertaking urban planning projects for new districts, one of the concepts considered for the area around Krakowski Park was the extension of Kochanowski Street beyond the line of the newly constructed Three Poets' Avenue (Aleje Trzech Wieszczów), which replaced the circumvallation railway, and its continuation through the Krakowski Park. This proposal was ultimately not implemented.

== Buildings ==
The original development of the street included the section from the intersection with Michałowski Street to the present-day Mickiewicz Avenue. It primarily consists of tenement houses built in the historicism style. The section of the street from the intersection with Michałowski Street southward was developed between 1901 and 1903 with a group of tenements designed by Kazimierz Zieliński, commissioned by S. Stachowski. The facades of these buildings represent early modernism complemented by neo-Gothic forms inspired by folk art, as well as Art Nouveau elements.

- 1 Jan Kochanowski Street – Tenement house with neo-Gothic architectural features. Designed by Kazimierz Zieliński, 1903.
- 2 Jan Kochanowski Street – Tenement house with Art Nouveau architectural features. Designed by Kazimierz Zieliński, 1901.
- 3 Jan Kochanowski Street – Tenement house with neo-Gothic architectural features. Designed by Kazimierz Zieliński, 1903.
- 4 Jan Kochanowski Street – Tenement house with Art Nouveau architectural features. Designed by Kazimierz Zieliński, circa 1901–1902.
- 5 Jan Kochanowski Street – Tenement house designed by Kazimierz Zieliński, 1902. Formerly the building of the III High School named after Jan Kochanowski. Currently, it houses the Collegium Medicum of the Jagiellonian University, serving as the seat of the Faculty of Health Sciences.
- 6 Jan Kochanowski Street (14 Piotr Michałowski Street) – Tenement house built at the beginning of the 20th century, featuring a stark modernist facade with white brick decoration. Originally the seat of the CK Main Tax Office and CK Cadastre Registry.
- 7 Jan Kochanowski Street (12 Piotr Michałowski Street) – Tenement house designed by Kazimierz Zieliński, 1902. Currently, it houses the Collegium Medicum of the Jagiellonian University, serving as the seat of the Faculty of Health Sciences.
- 8 Jan Kochanowski Street (11 Piotr Michałowski Street) – Tenement house in the historicism style, built in 1895.
- 9 Jan Kochanowski Street (9 Piotr Michałowski Street) – Tenement house in the historicism style, built between 1899 and 1901 for A. Czarnowski (initials woven into the balcony railing). Later, the building was owned by Zofia and Ludwik Piotrowicz, who bequeathed it to the Jagiellonian University. The staircase is adorned with "Pompeian" paintings.
- 10 Jan Kochanowski Street – Tenement house in the historicism style, built in 1897.
- 14 Jan Kochanowski Street – Tenement house in the neo-Baroque style. Fragments of painted decoration have been preserved on the staircase.
- 15 Jan Kochanowski Street (12 Ambroży Grabowski Street) – villa surrounded by a garden, featuring Art Nouveau decoration on the facade.
- 17 Jan Kochanowski Street (13 Ambroży Grabowski Street) – Tenement house in the historicism style.
- 18 Jan Kochanowski Street – Tenement house with sgraffito decoration by Antoni Tuch on the facade, built between 1897 and 1898.
- 19 Jan Kochanowski Street – Tenement house in the neo-Gothic style, built around 1900.
- 20 Jan Kochanowski Street – Tenement house in the neo-Gothic style, built around 1890.
- 21 Jan Kochanowski Street – A neo-Renaissance tenement house, built before 1896. It was the private home of licensed master mason Tomasz Bujas.
- 22 Jan Kochanowski Street – Tenement house in the historicism style, designed by Zygmunt Prokesz, circa 1890. At the turn of the 20th century, a bakery was built in the tenement's outbuilding.
- 25 Jan Kochanowski Street (39 Adam Mickiewicz Avenue) – Tenement house with neoclassical elements, built in 1895.
- 26 Jan Kochanowski Street – Tenement house in the historicism style, built in 1893 for J. Różycki.
- 28 Jan Kochanowski Street – Tenement house in the historicism style, built in 1895 for J. Różycki.
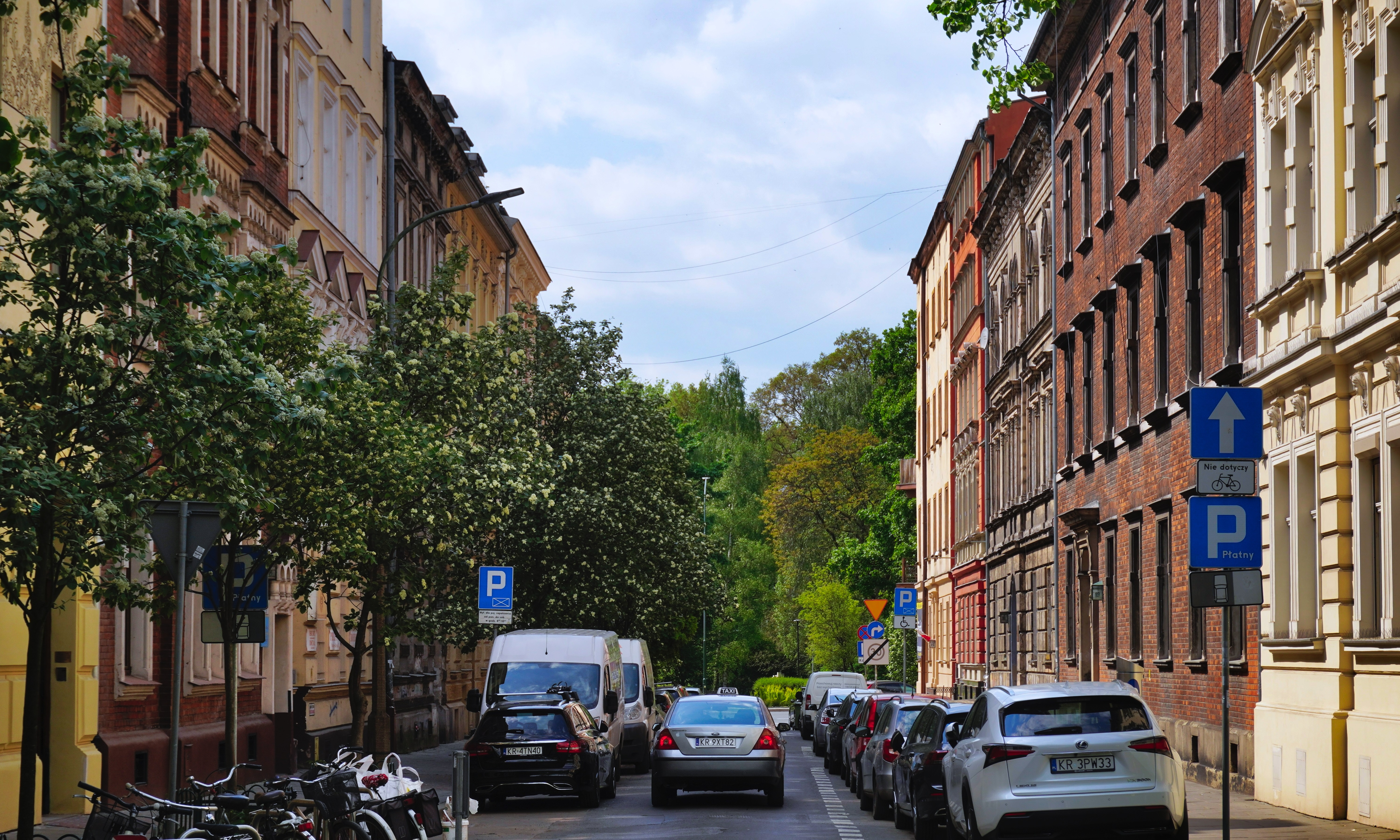
View to the southwest, from the intersection with Ambroży Grabowski Street

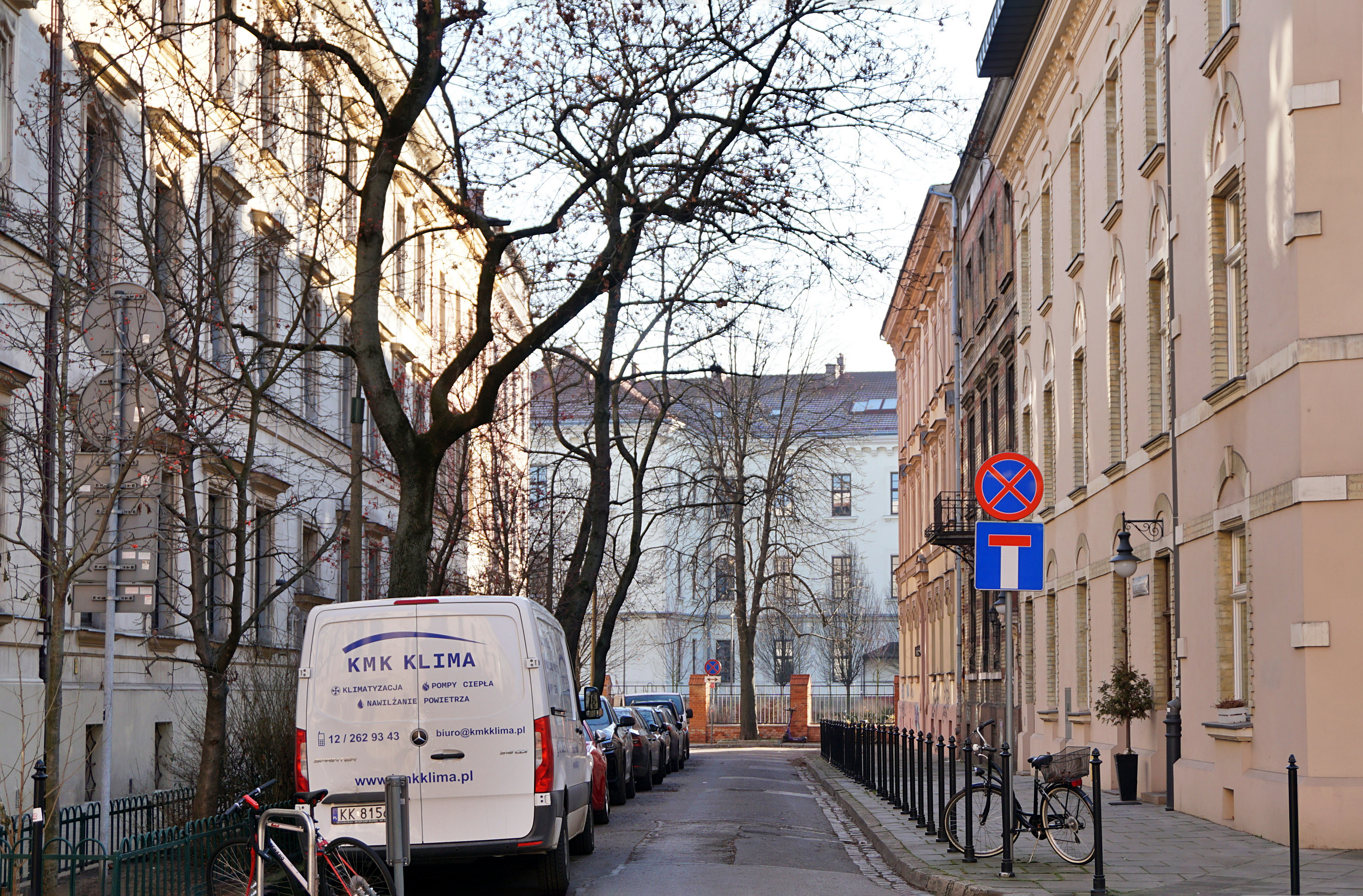
View southeast from the intersection with Piotra Michałowskiego Street

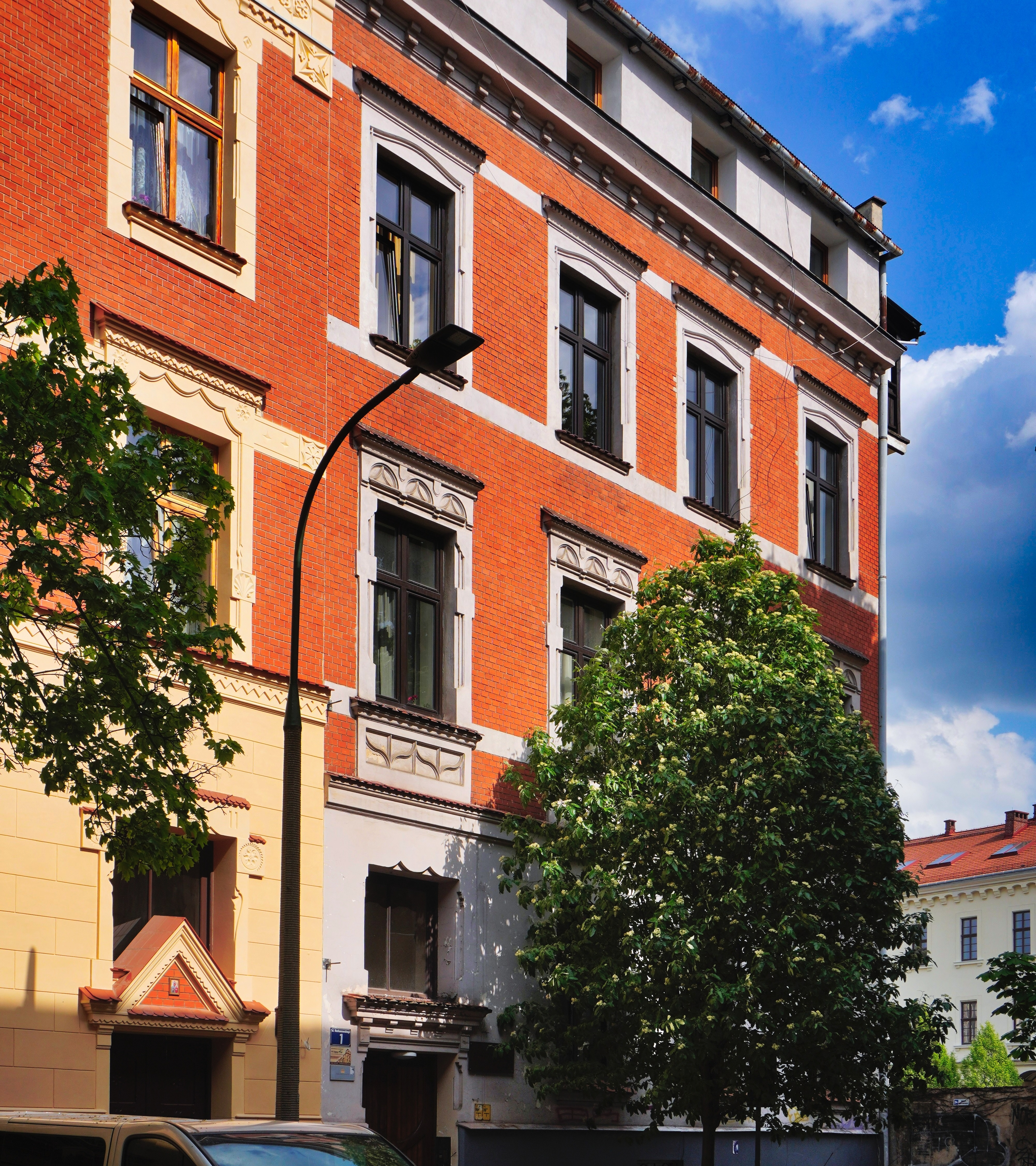
1 Jan Kochanowski Street
Tenement house (design. Kazimierz Zieliński, 1903)

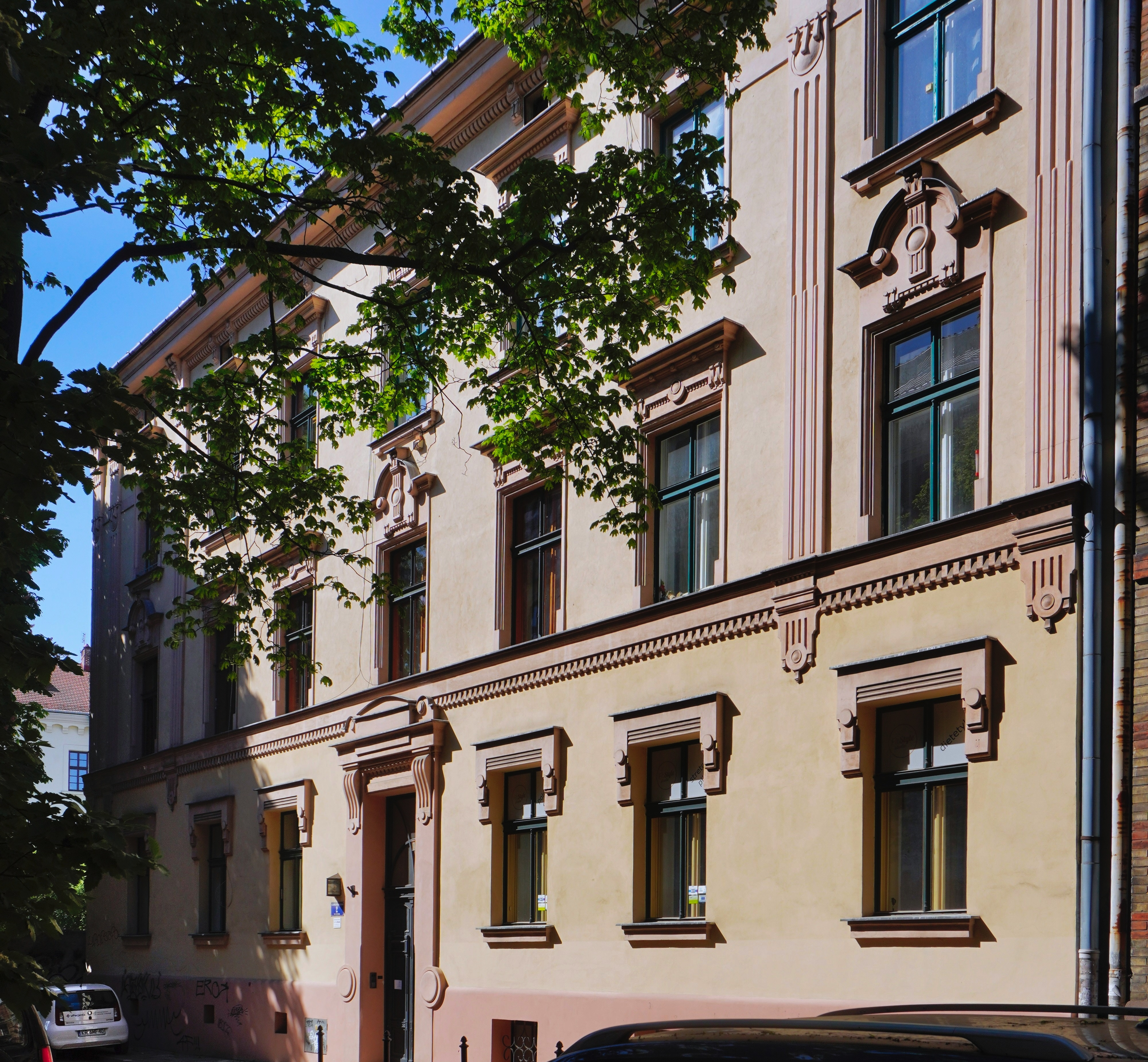
2 Jan Kochanowski Street
Tenement house (design. Kazimierz Zieliński, 1901)

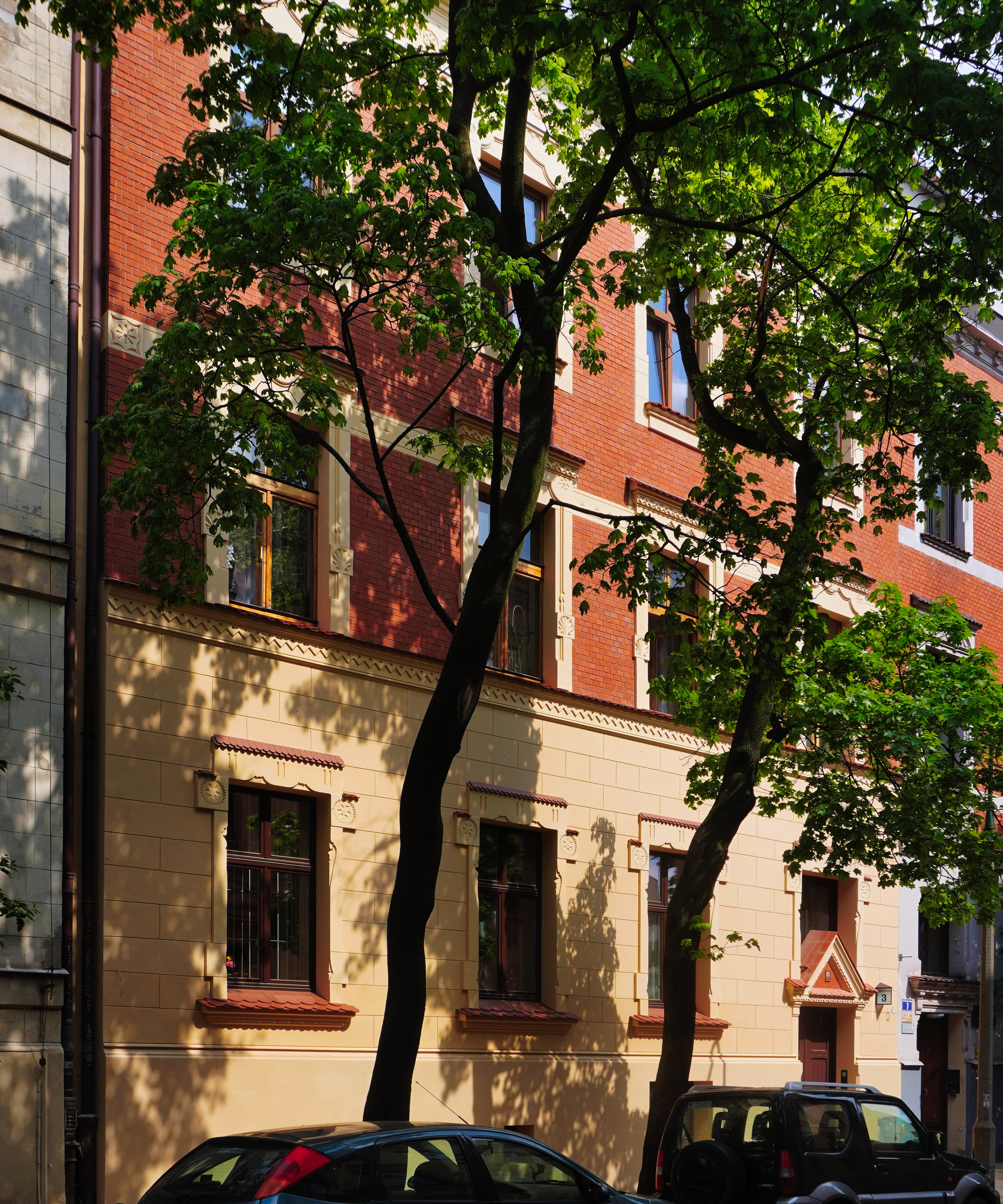
3 Jan Kochanowski Street
Tenement house (design. Kazimierz Zieliński, 1903)

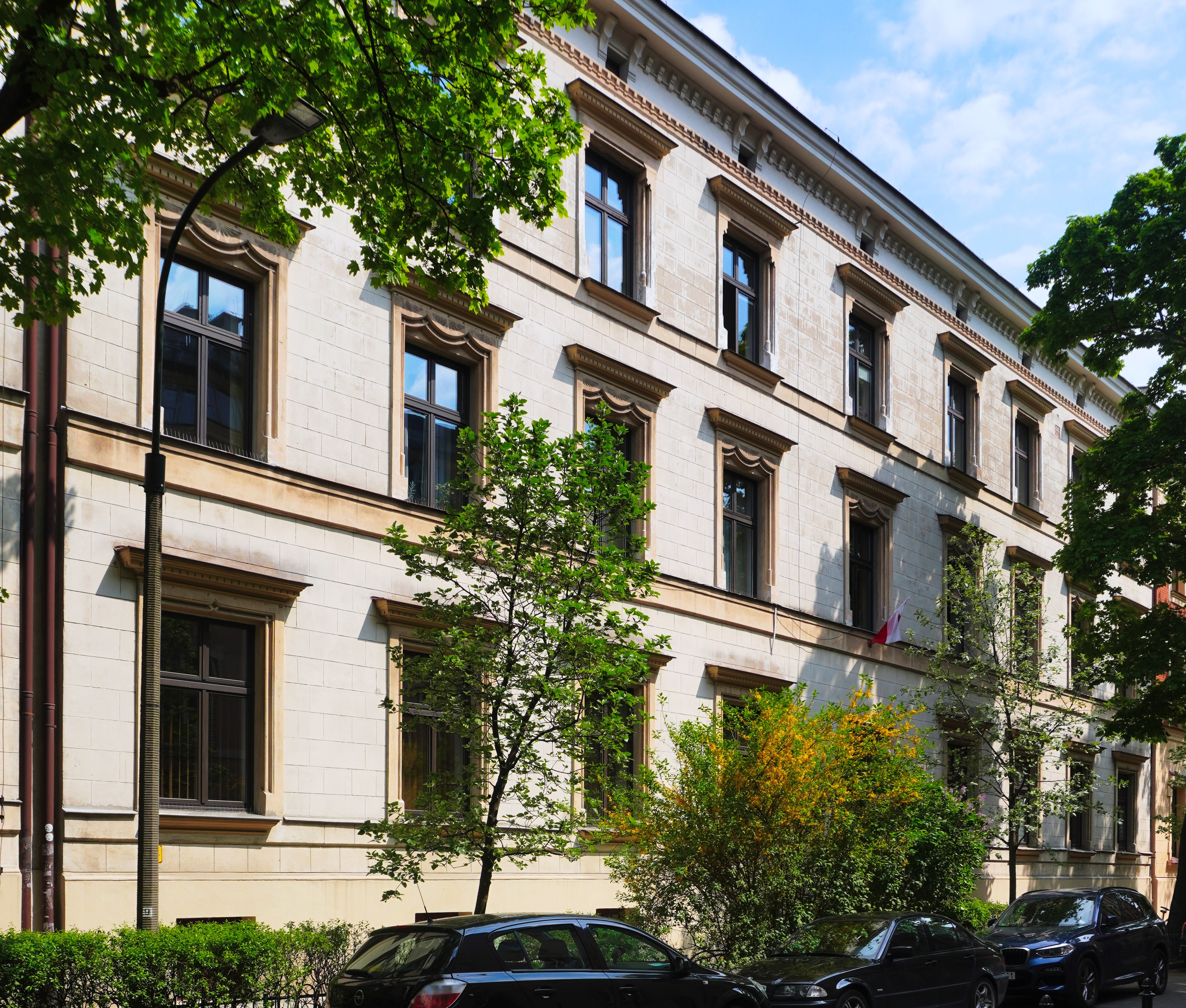
5 Jan Kochanowski Street
Teaching building, formerly the seat of the 3rd Secondary School, currently the building of the Collegium Medicum of the Jagiellonian University, Faculty of Health Sciences (design. Kazimierz Zieliński, 1902)

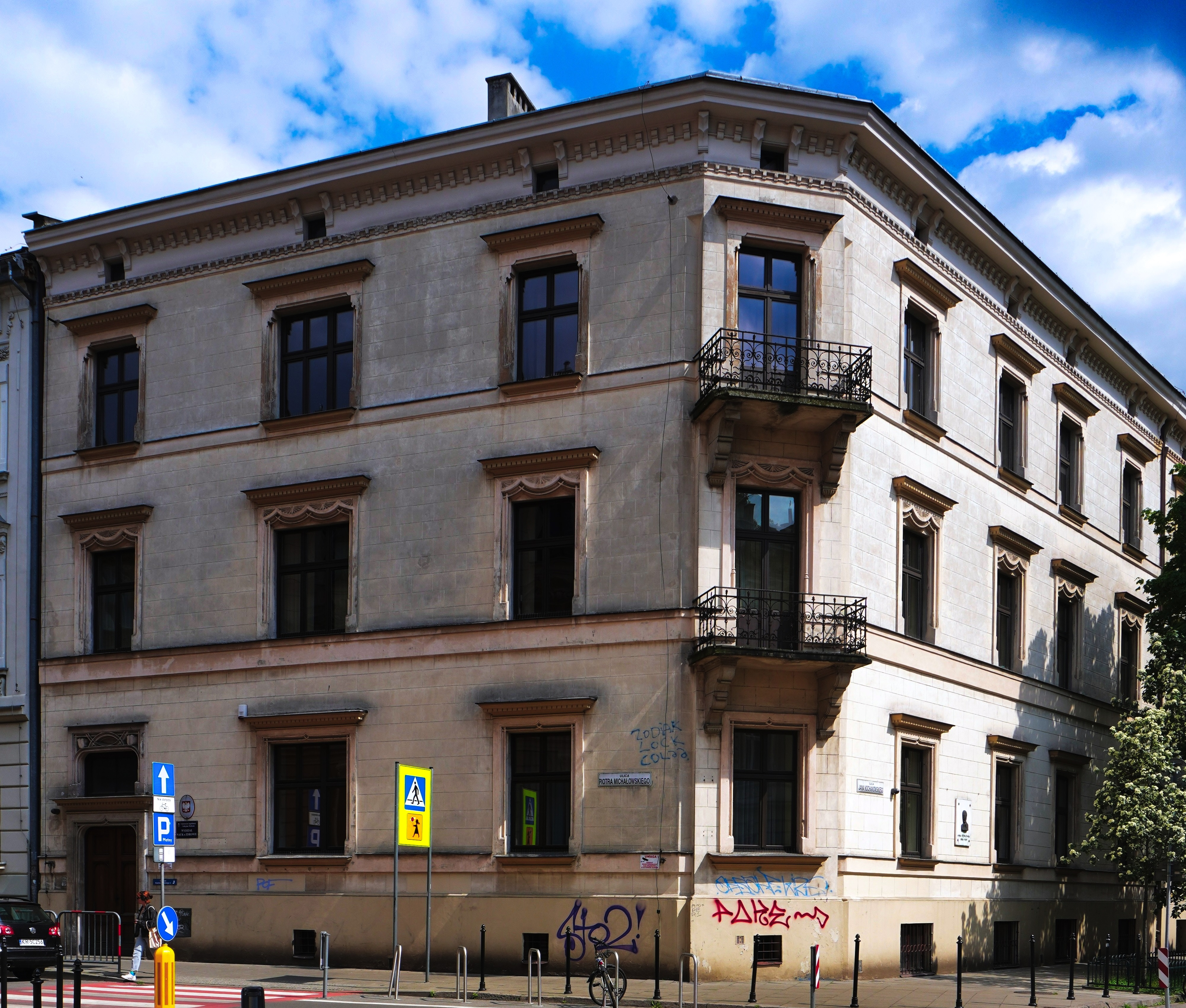
7 Jan Kochanowski Street (12 Piotr Michałowski Street)
Tenement house, currently the building of the Collegium Medicum of the Jagiellonian University, Faculty of Health Sciences (design. Kazimierz Zieliński, 1902)

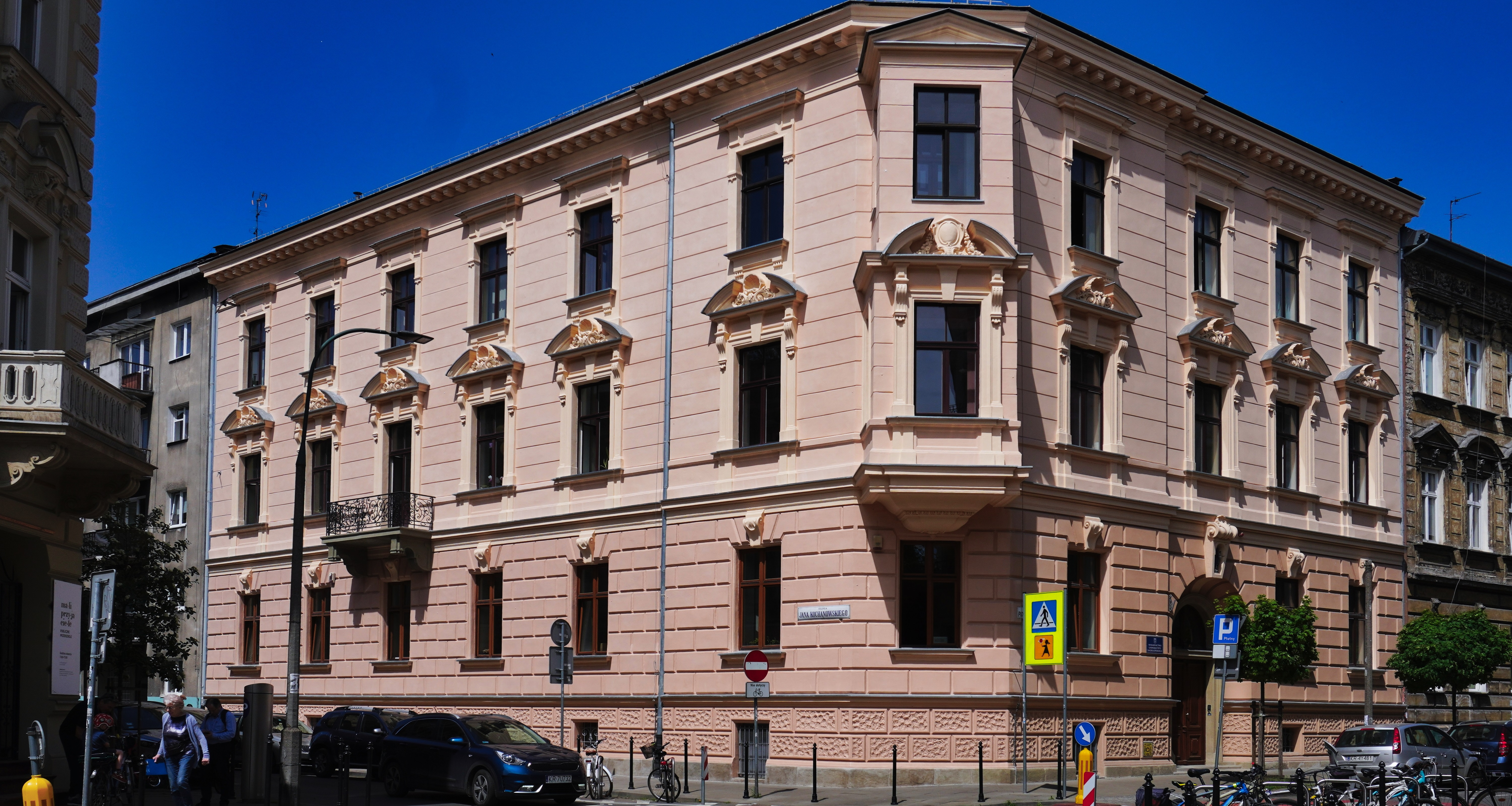
9 Jan Kochanowski Street (9 Piotr Michałowski Street)
Tenement house, the seat of the Jagiellonian University Publishing House (1899–1901)

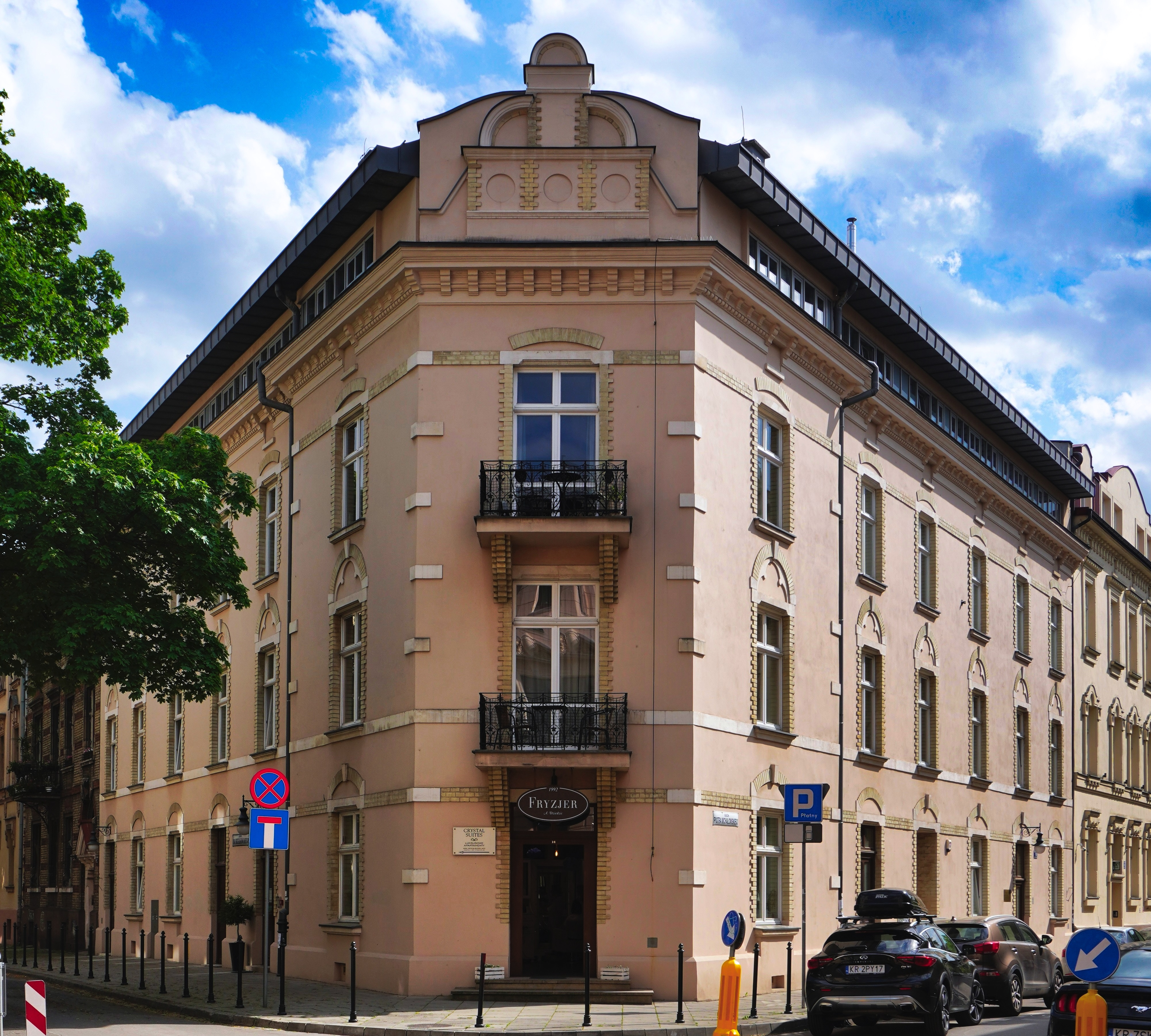
16 Jan Kochanowski Street (14 Piotr Michałowski Street)
Tenement house (1910)

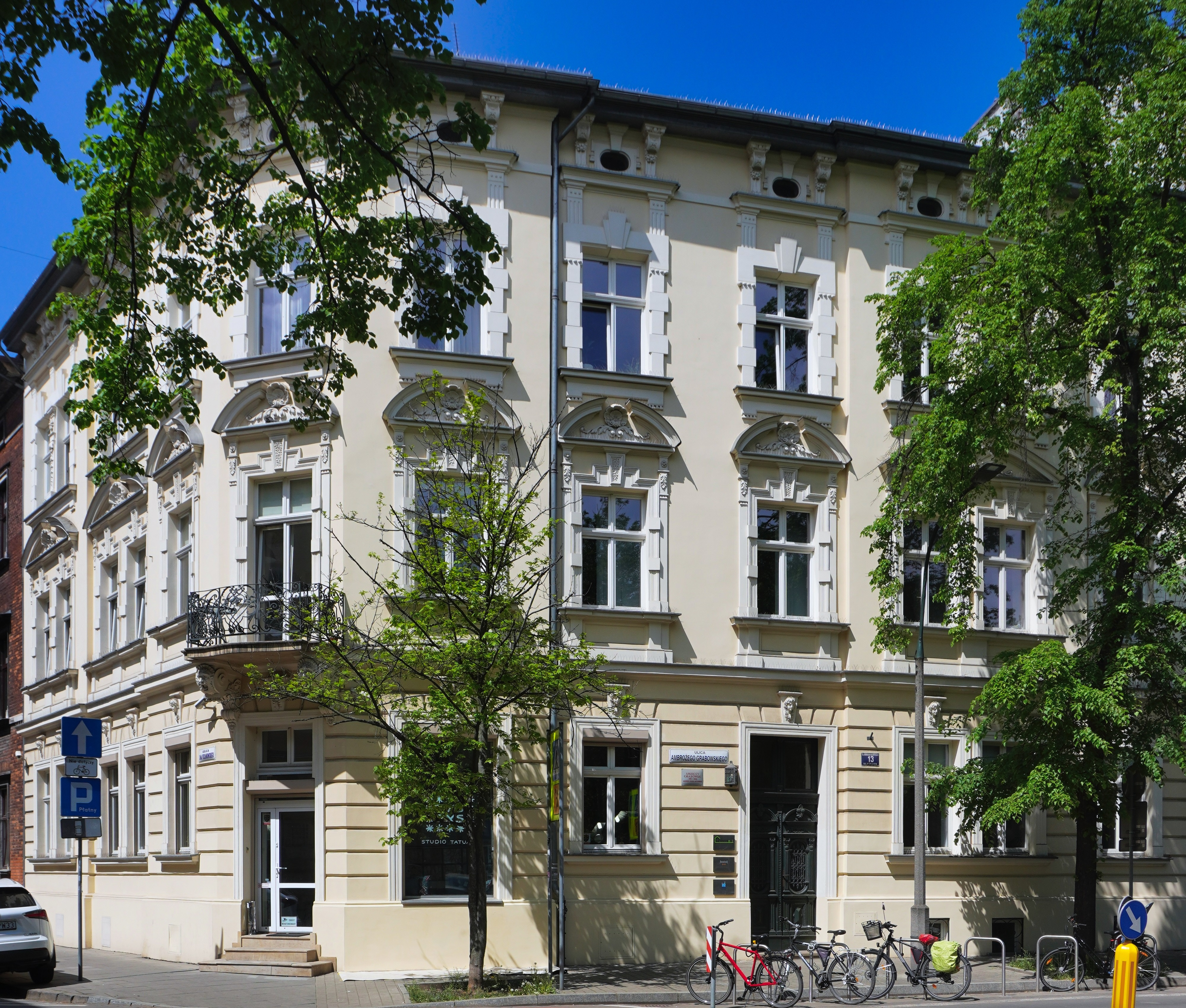
17 Jan Kochanowski Street (13 Ambroży Grabowski Street)
Tenement house

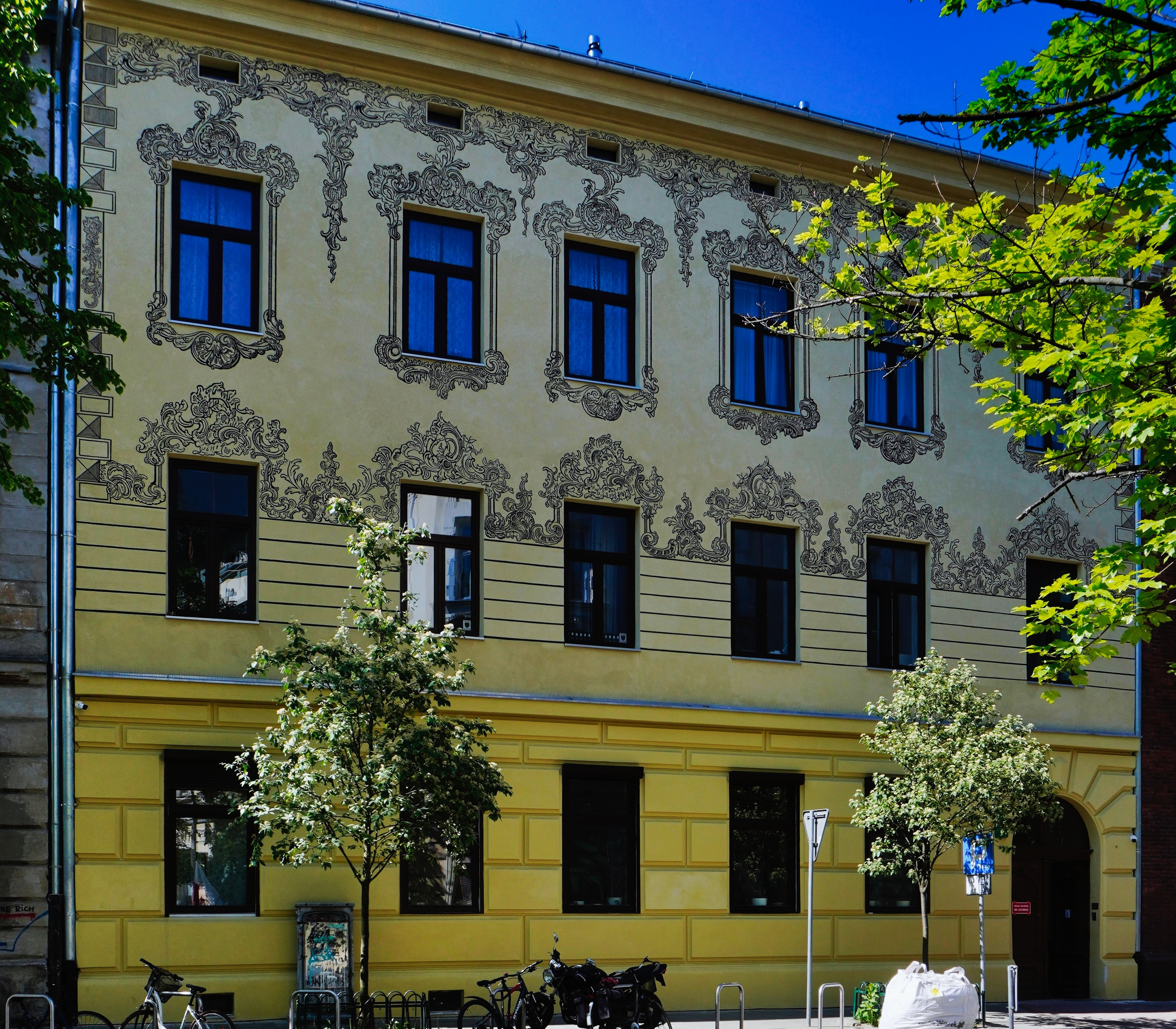
18 Jan Kochanowski Street
Tenement house with sgraffito decoration on the facade (1897–1898)

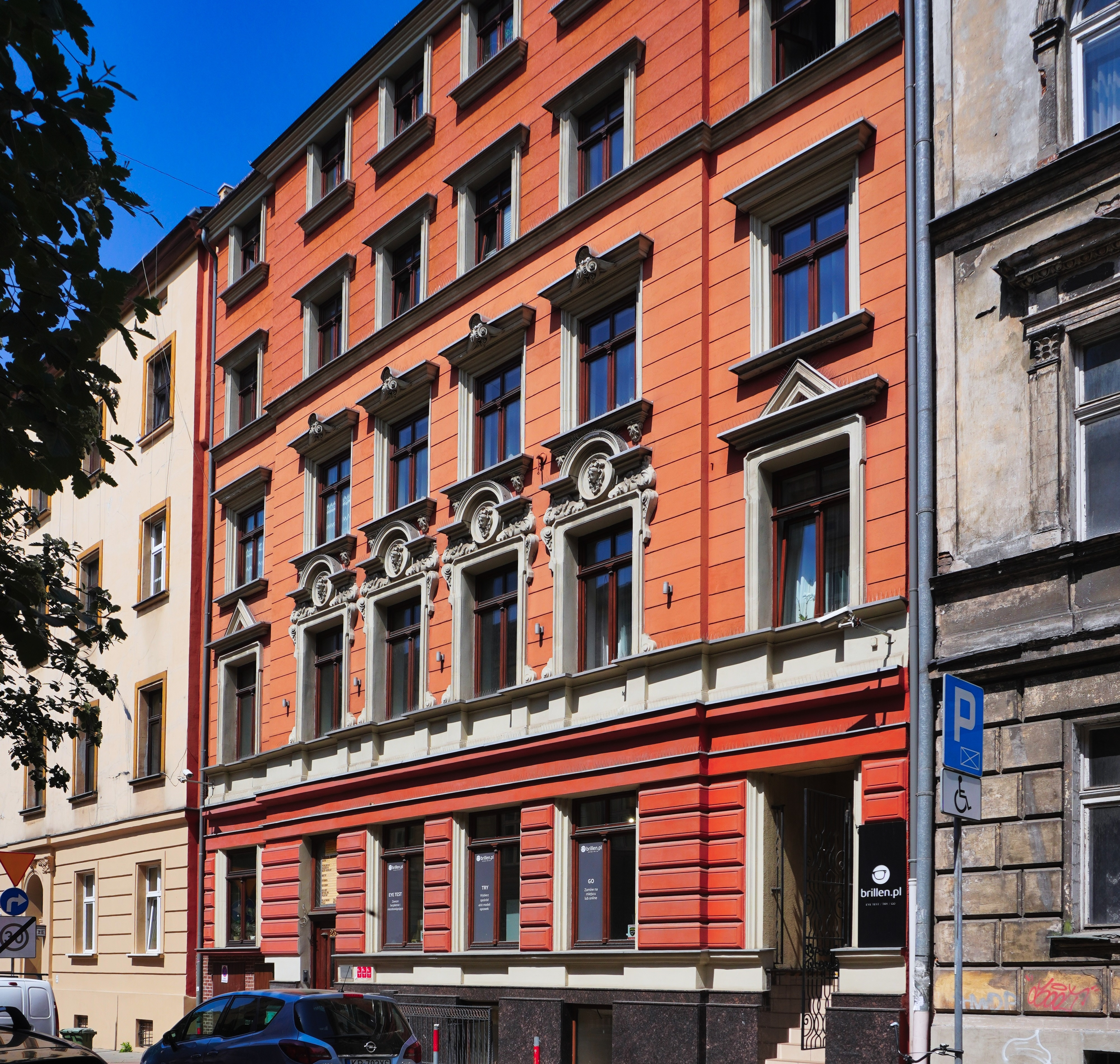
23 Jan Kochanowski Street
Tenement house (1900)

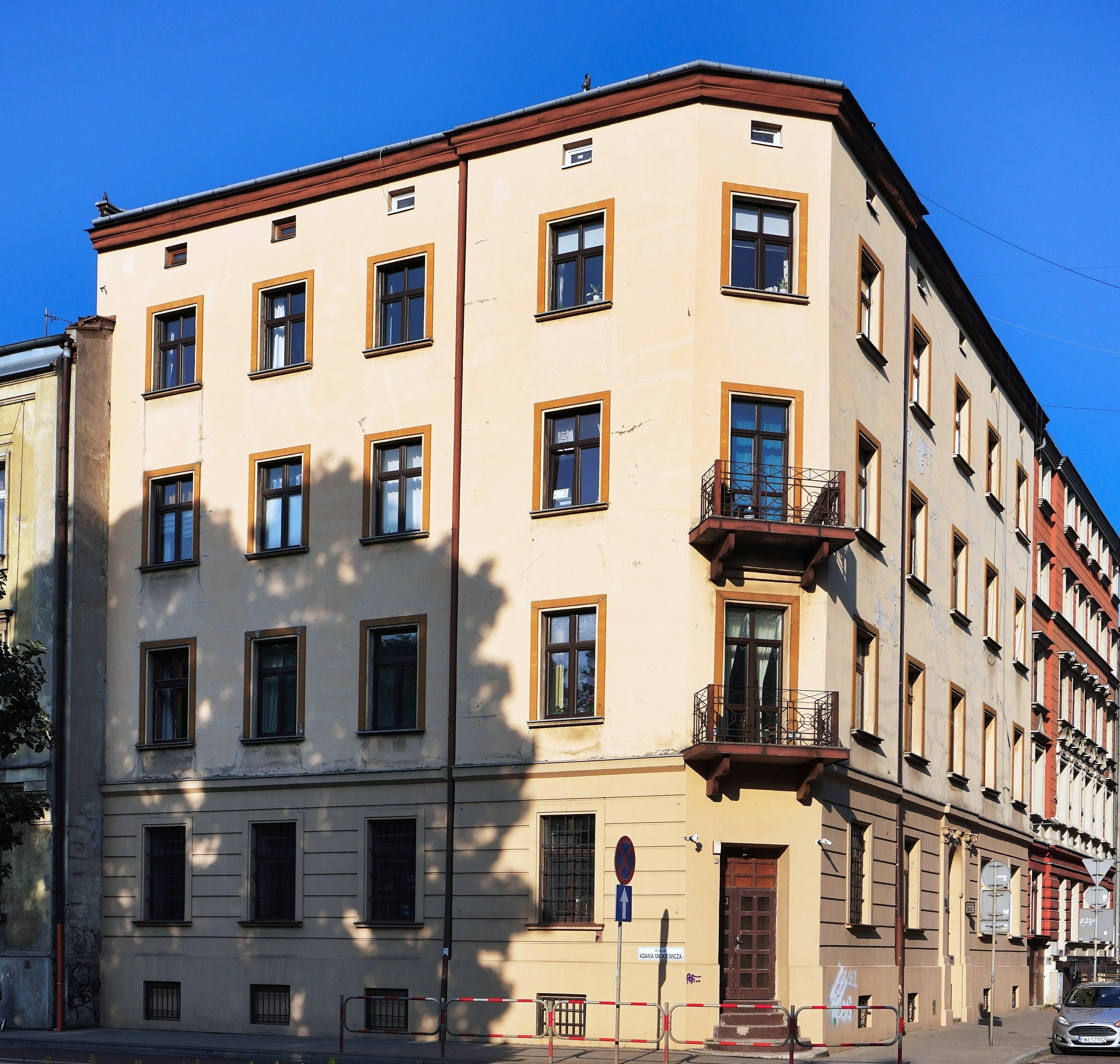
25 Jan Kochanowski Street (39 Adam Mickiewicz Avenue)
Tenement house (builder A. Zajączkowski, 1895)
