= Piotr Michałowski Street =

Street in Kraków, Poland

Piotr Michałowski street
Kraków
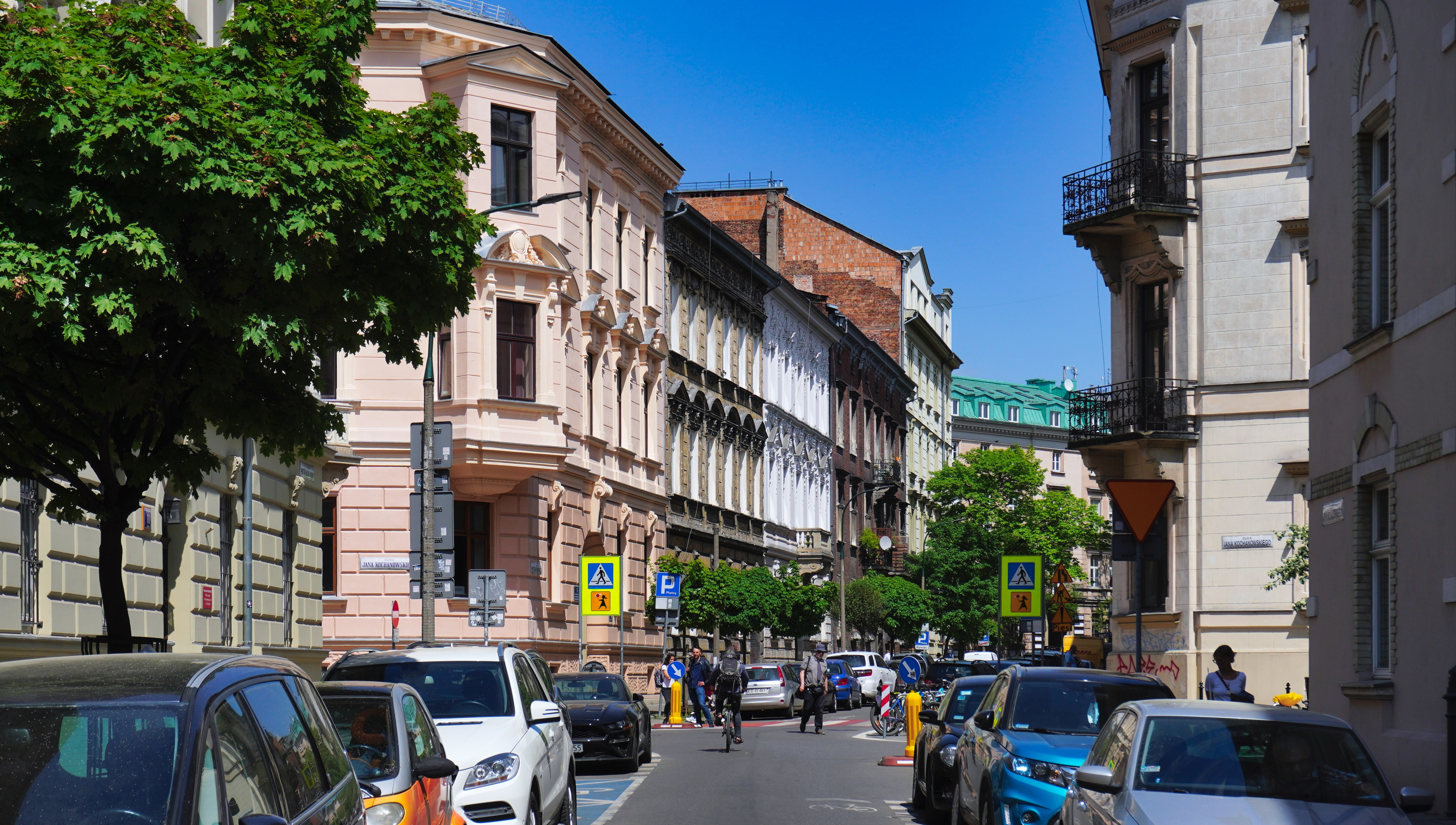
- View to the north-east, from Czarnowiejska Street
- Interactive map of Piotr Michałowski street
- Part of: Kraków Old Town district
- Owner: City of Kraków
- Location: Kraków, Poland

Piotr Michałowski Street in Kraków is a street in Kraków, in District I Old Town, in Piasek.

It runs from Karmelicka Street in a south-western direction to the intersection with Czarnowiejska and Dolnych Młynów streets.

== Historia ==
The street was laid out at the end of the 19th century. Originally, it was called Graniczna Street due to its location on the then outskirts of the city, near its administrative boundaries. The street received its current name in 1913. It commemorates the Kraków painter Piotr Michałowski, the founder of the St. Joseph's Institute for Orphaned Boys located nearby on Karmelicka Street.

== Buildings ==
The buildings along the street are predominantly tenement houses constructed in the 1890s and early 20th century, designed in historicist styles.

- 1 Piotr Michałowski Street (44 Karmelicka Street) – Tenement house. Designed by Tadeusz Stryjeński and Józef Pokutyński, 1895.
- 2 Piotr Michałowski Street (42 Karmelicka Street) – Tenement house in an eclectic style. Designed by Władysław Ekielski, circa 1895.
- 3 Piotr Michałowski Street – Tenement house in a historicist style with facade decorations referencing the so-called "Northern Renaissance." Designed by Kazimierz Zieliński, 1898–1899.
- 4 Piotr Michałowski Street – Tenement house with Neo-Gothic architectural features. Designed by Kazimierz Zieliński, 1903–1904.
- 5 Piotr Michałowski Street – Tenement house in a historicist style. Designed by Aleksander Biborski, 1895.
- 6 Piotr Michałowski Street – Tenement house in an Art Nouveau style. Designed by Beniamin Torbe, 1905.
- 7 Piotr Michałowski Street – Tenement house in a historicist style. Designed by Ignacy Hercok, 1896.
- 8–10 Piotr Michałowski Street – Tenement house built for Maurycy and Amalia Waldmann. Designed by Beniamin Torbe, 1899–1900. From 1901, the building housed a branch of the Imperial-Royal Secondary School (CK Szkoła Realna); currently, it serves as an elementary school.
- 9 Piotr Michałowski Street (9 Jan Kochanowski Street) – Tenement house in a historicist style, constructed in 1899–1901 for A. Czarnowski (initials woven into the balcony railing). Later, the building was owned by Zofia and Ludwik Piotrowicz, who bequeathed it to the Jagiellonian University. The staircase is adorned with "Pompeian-style" paintings.
- 11 Piotr Michałowski Street (8 Jan Kochanowski Street) – Tenement house in a historicist style. Built in 1895.
- 12 Piotr Michałowski Street (7 Jan Kochanowski Street) – Tenement house. Designed by Kazimierz Zieliński, 1902. Currently, it houses the Collegium Medicum of the Jagiellonian University, serving as the seat of the Faculty of Health Sciences.
- 13 Piotr Michałowski Street – Tenement house in a historicist style with sculpted facade decorations, built for J. Kozik. Designed by Karol Scharoch, 1895.
- 14 Piotr Michałowski Street (6 Jan Kochanowski Street) – Tenement house built in the early 20th century, featuring a stark, modernist facade with white brick decorations. Originally the seat of the Imperial-Royal Main Tax Office and Imperial-Royal Cadastre Registry.
- 15 Piotr Michałowski Street – Tenement house in a historicist style. Built around 1898. The attic was redesigned by Józef Pokutyński into a painting studio, used by artists such as Stanisław Górski.
- 18 Piotr Michałowski Street (1 Czarnowiejska Street) – Villa, 1880.
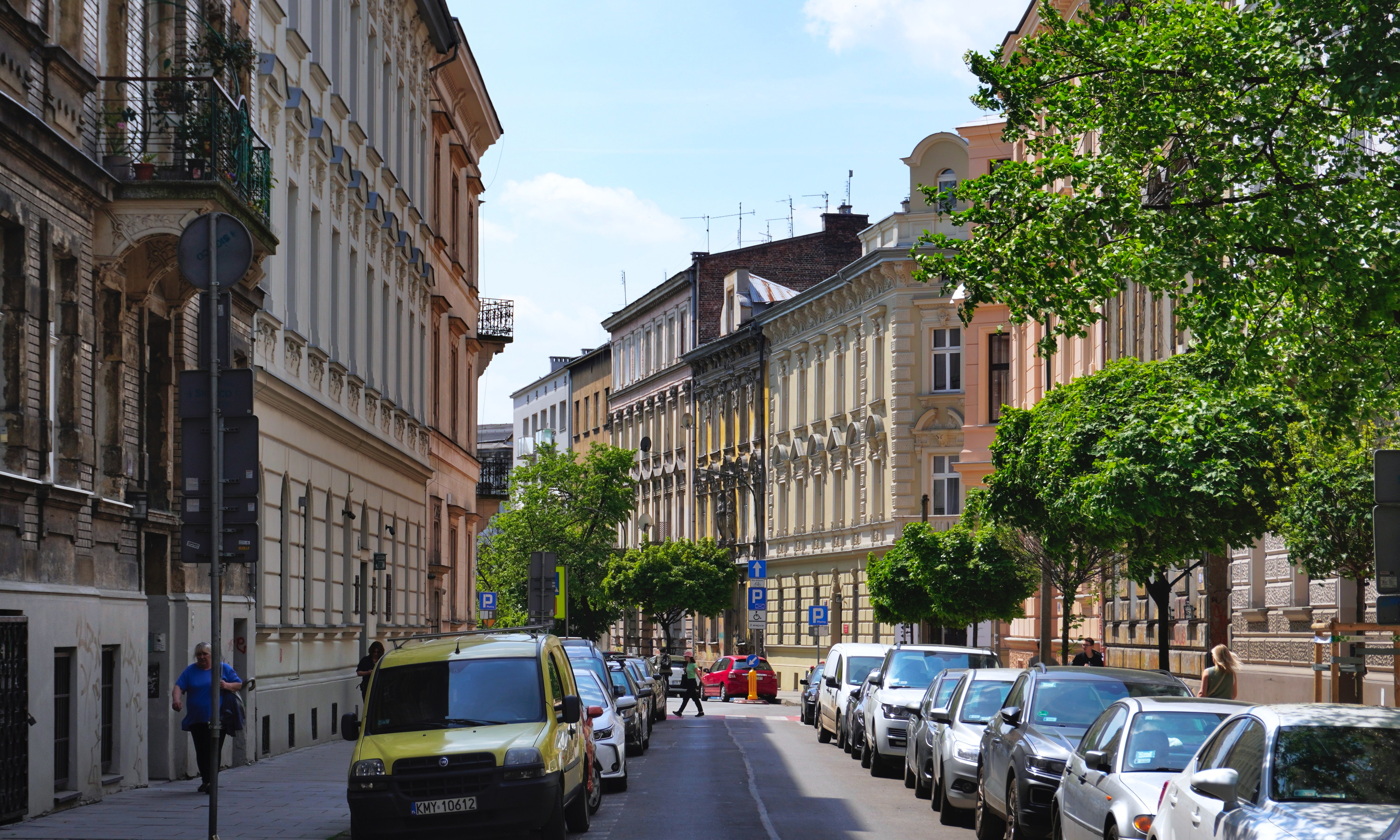
View to the southwest, from the intersection with Karmelicka Street

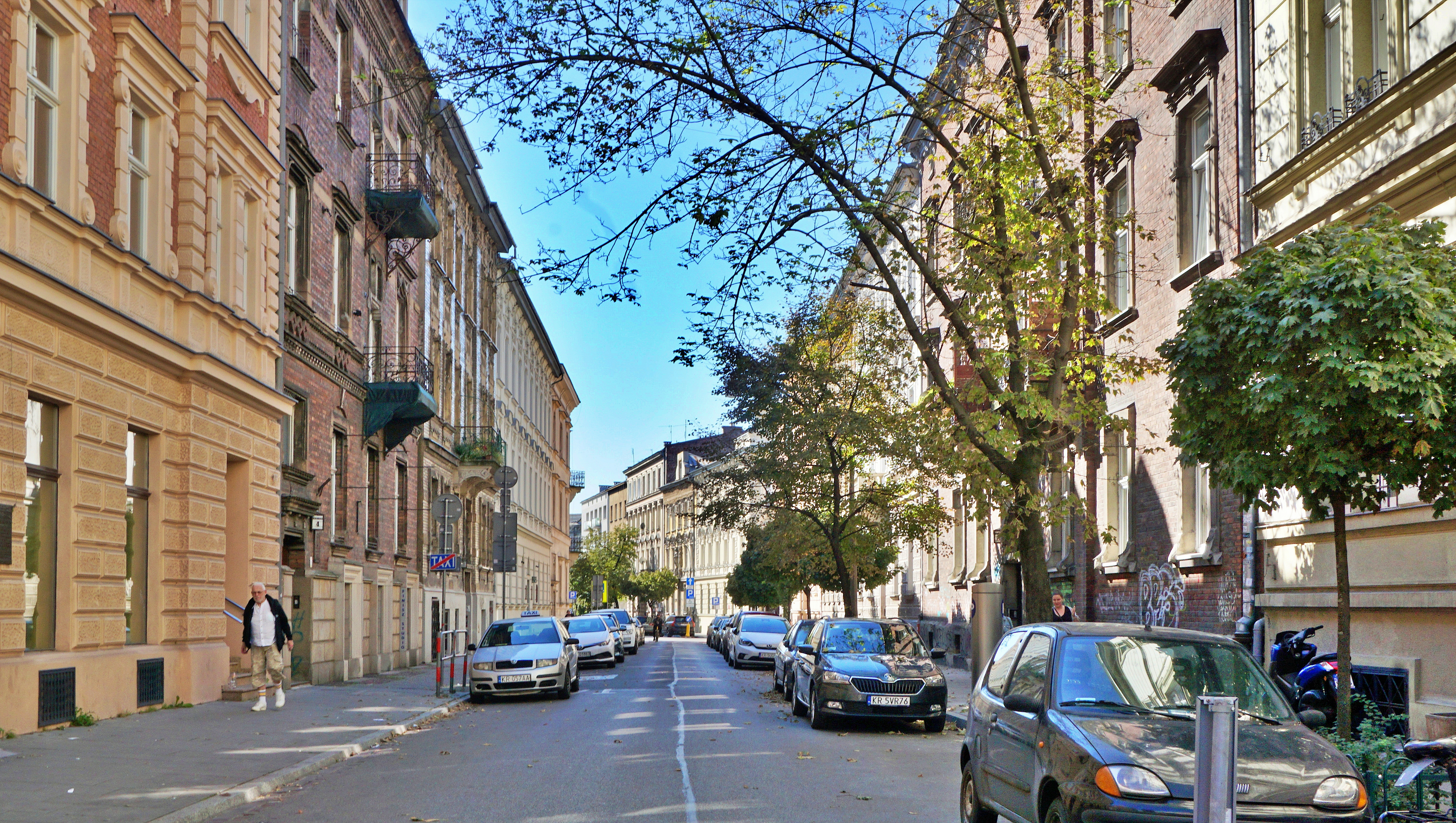
View to the southwest (2024)

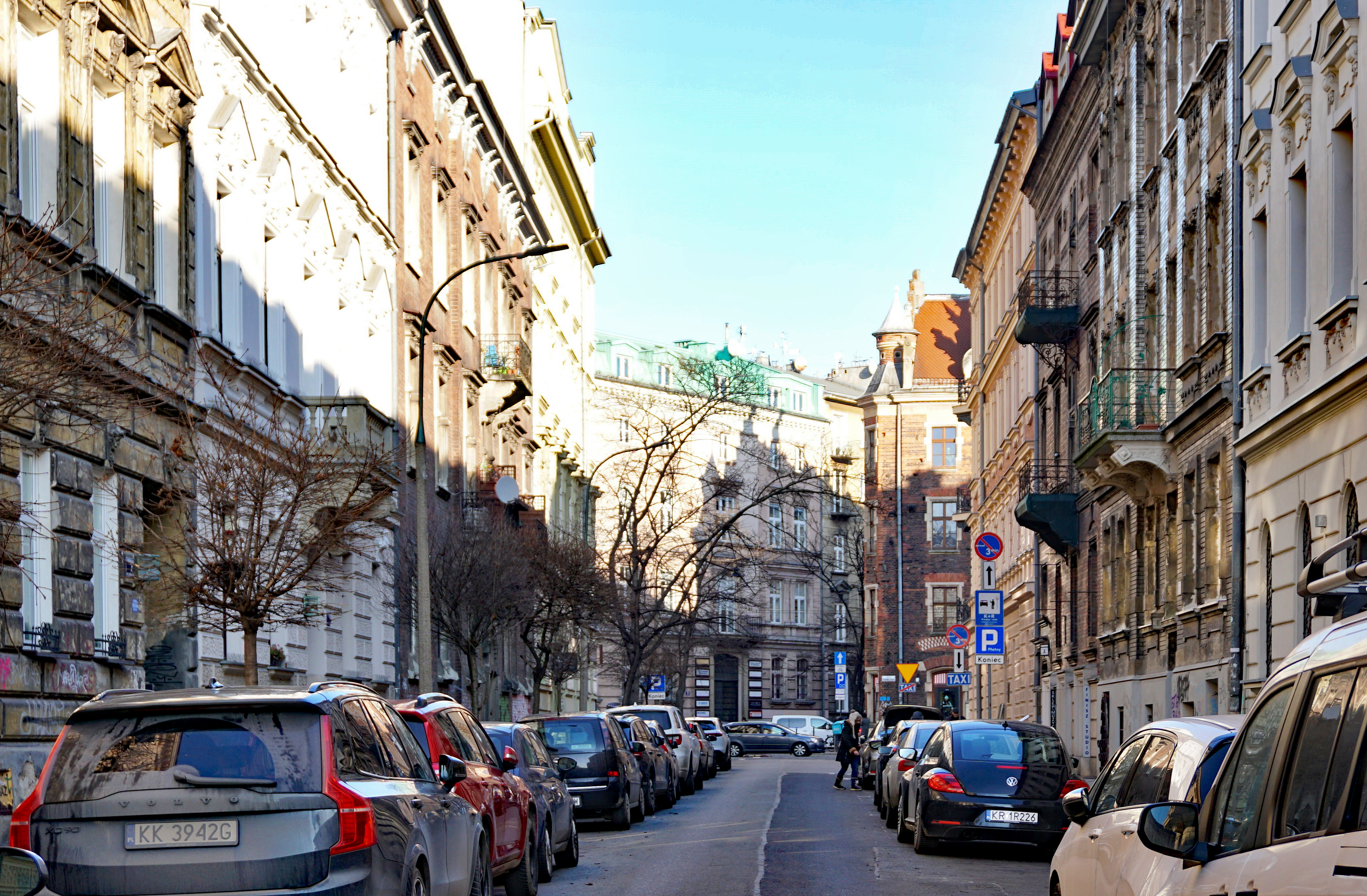
View to the northeast towards Karmelicka Street

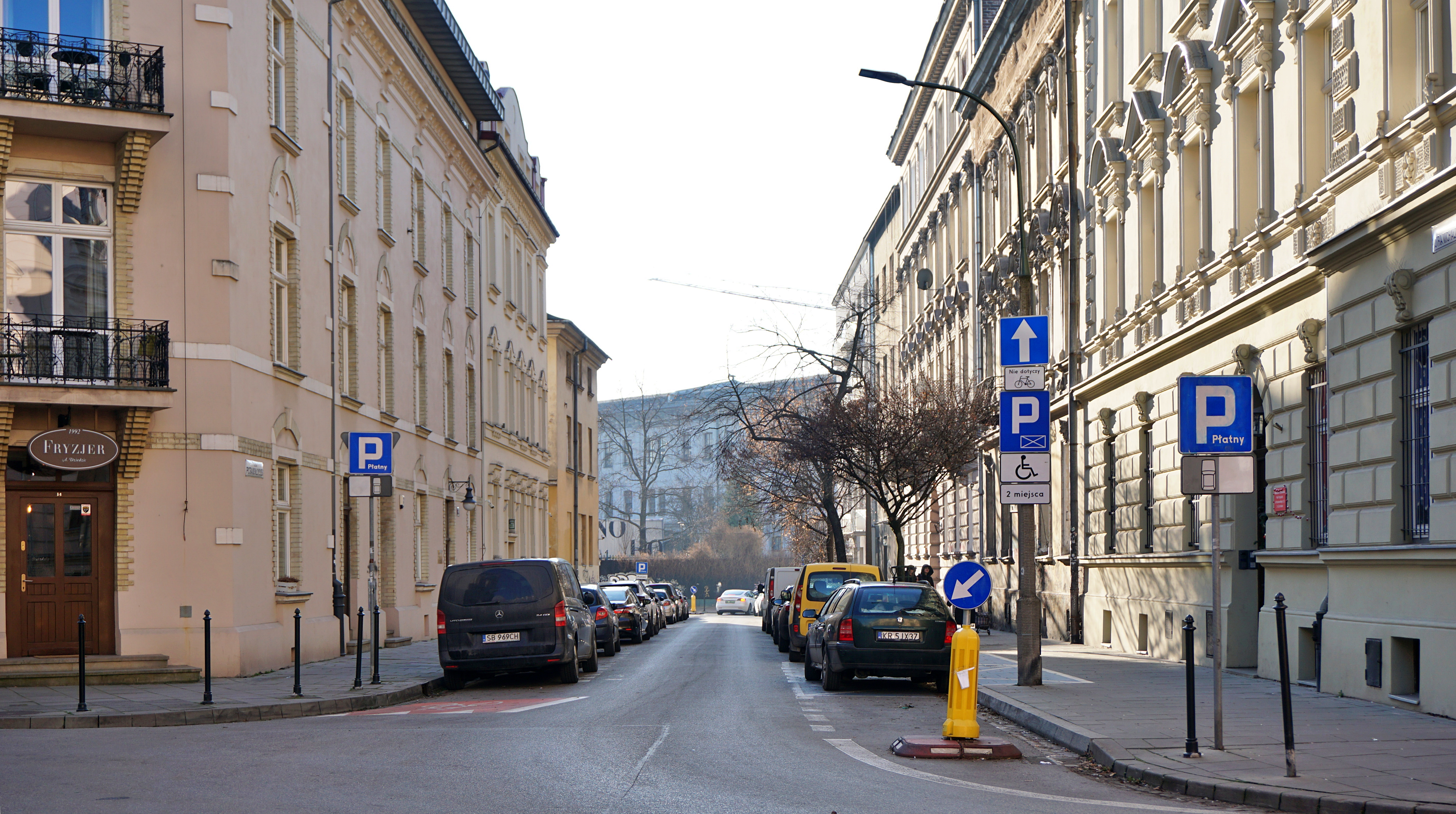
View south at the intersection from Jan Kochanowski Street

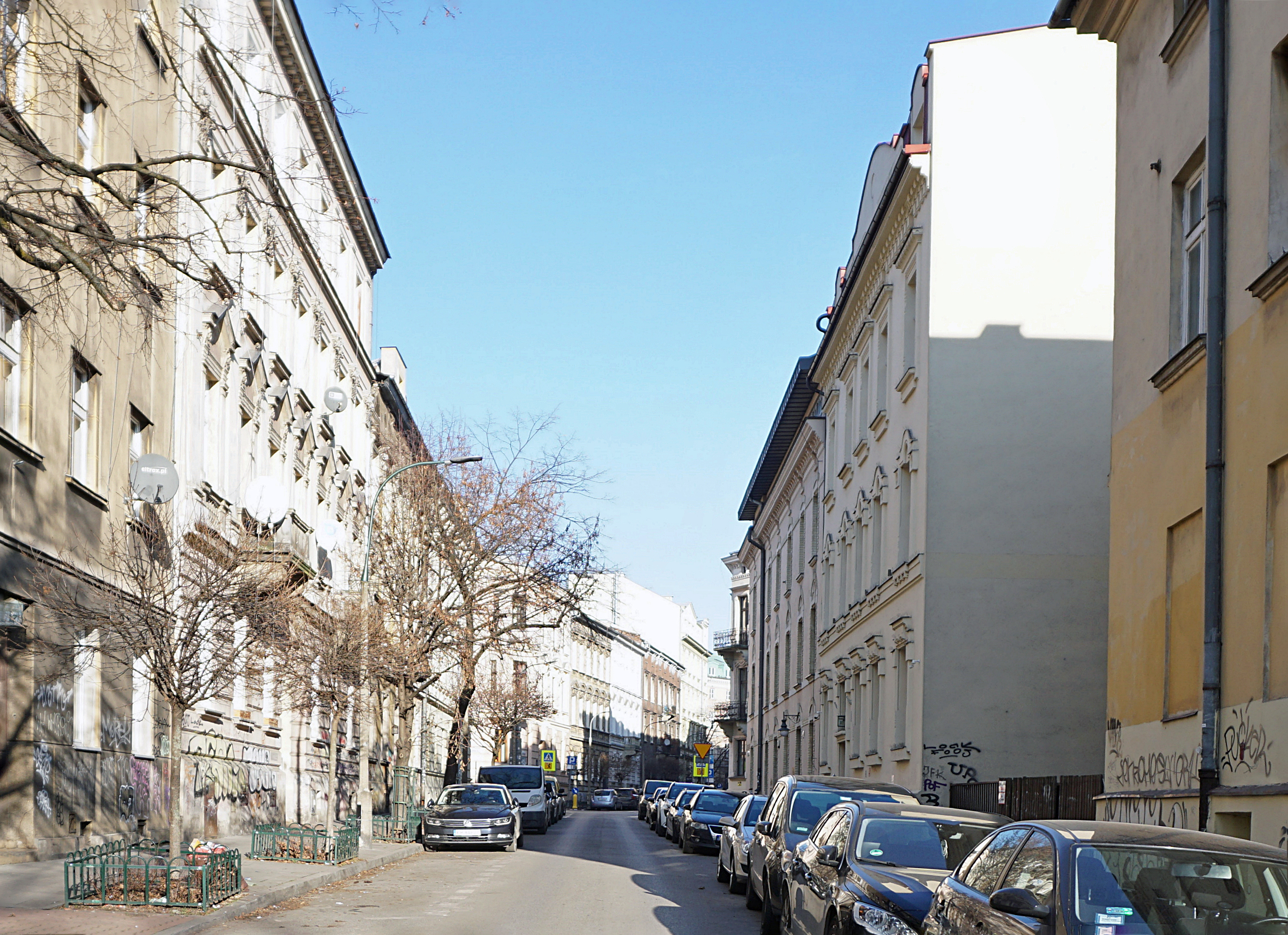
View north from the intersection with Czarnowiejska Street

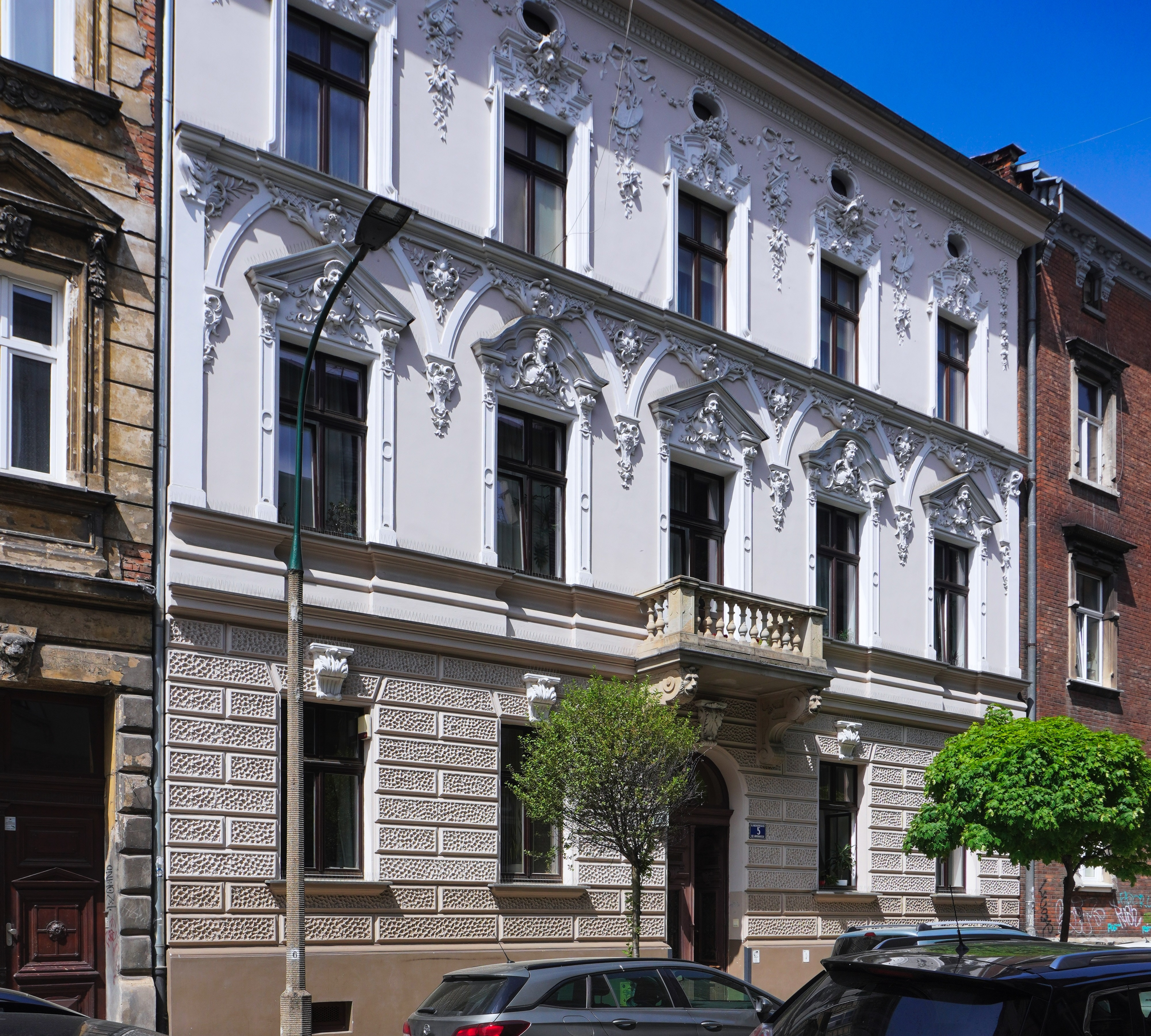
5 Piotr Michałowski Street
Tenement house (design. Aleksander Biborski, 1895)

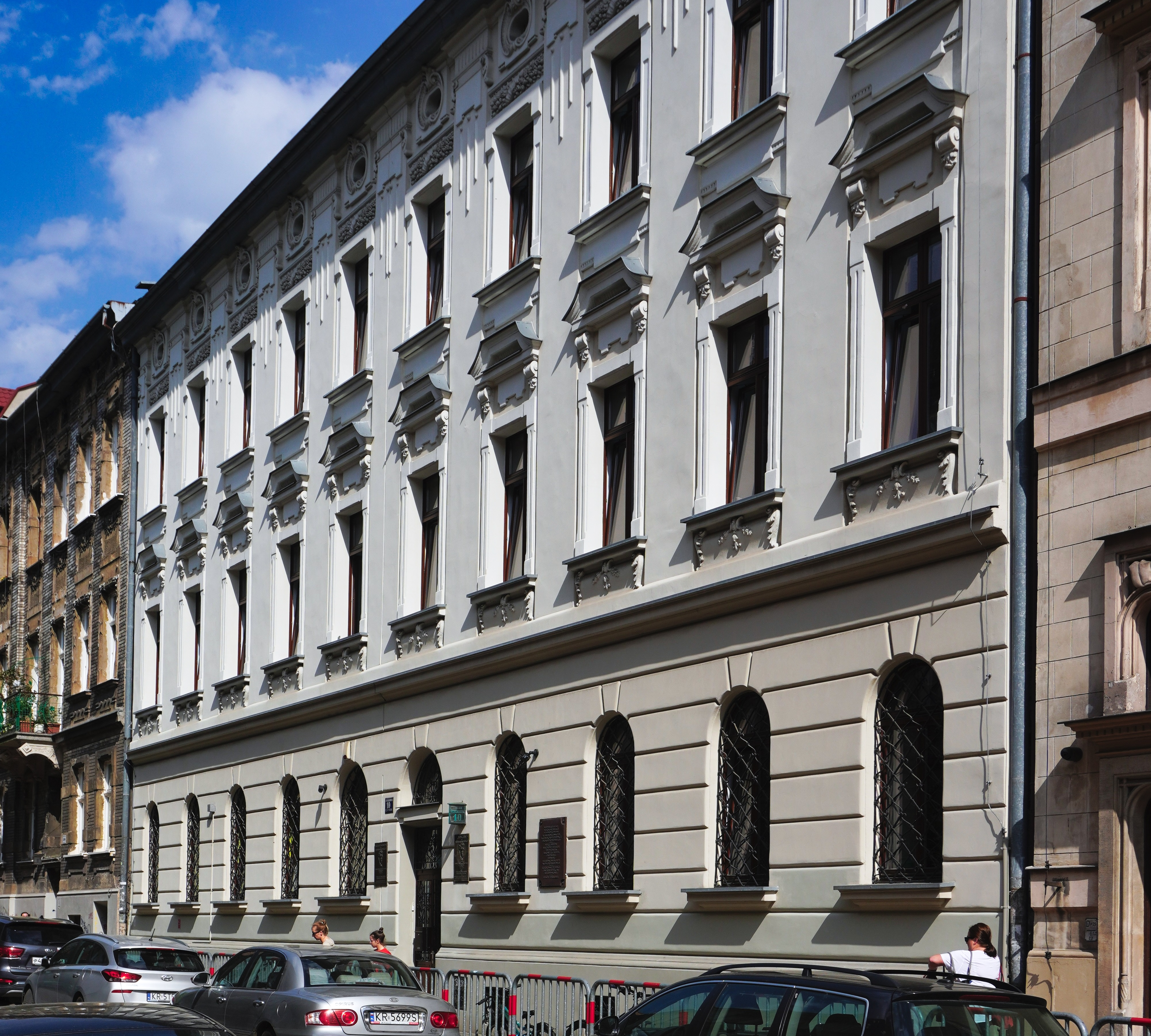
8–10 Piotr Michałowski Street
Tenement house, currently a primary school (design. Beniamin Torbe, 1899–1900)

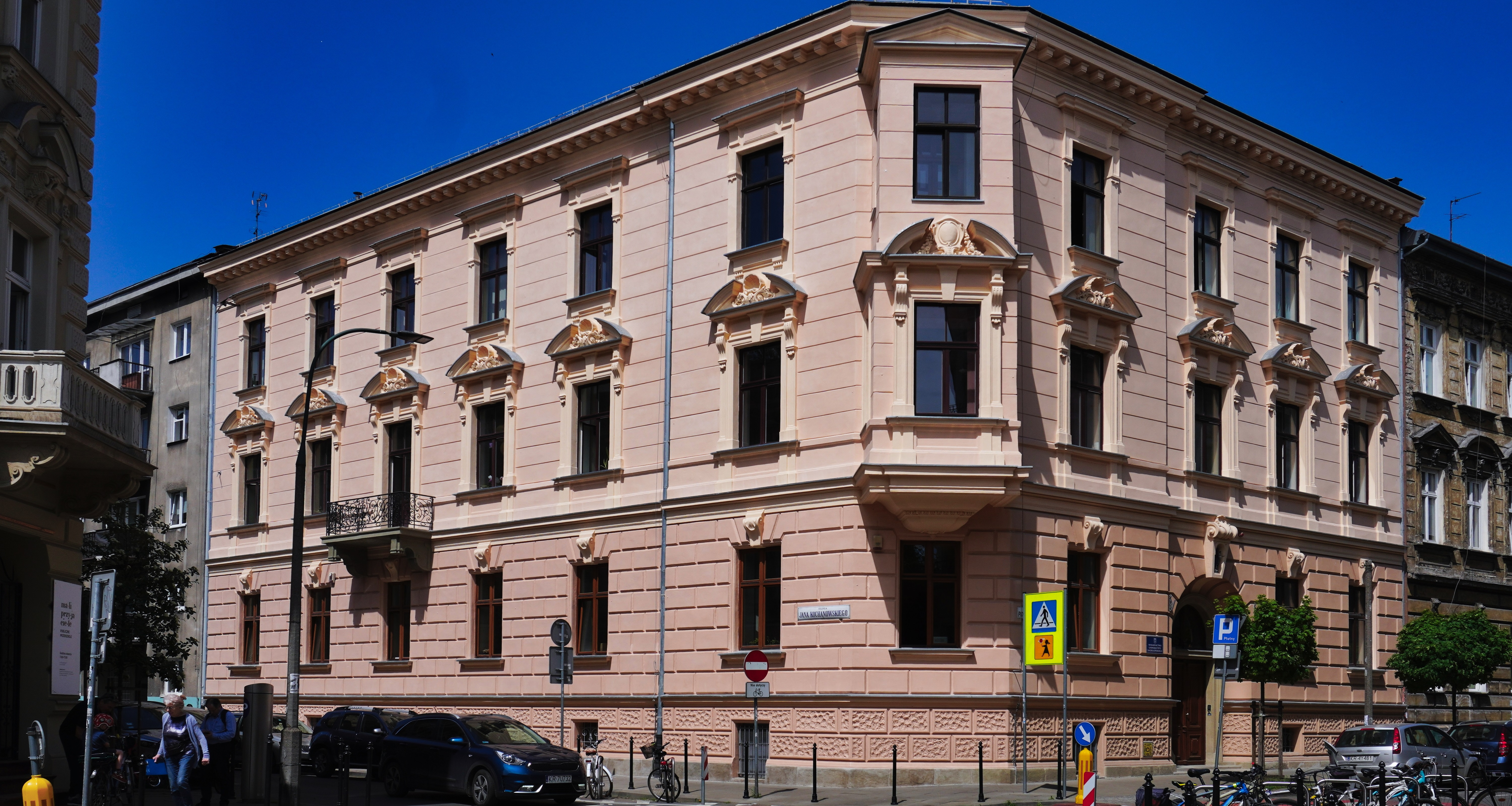
9 Piotr Michałowski Street (9 Jan Kochanowski Street)
Tenement house, seat of the Jagiellonian University Publishing House (1899–1901)

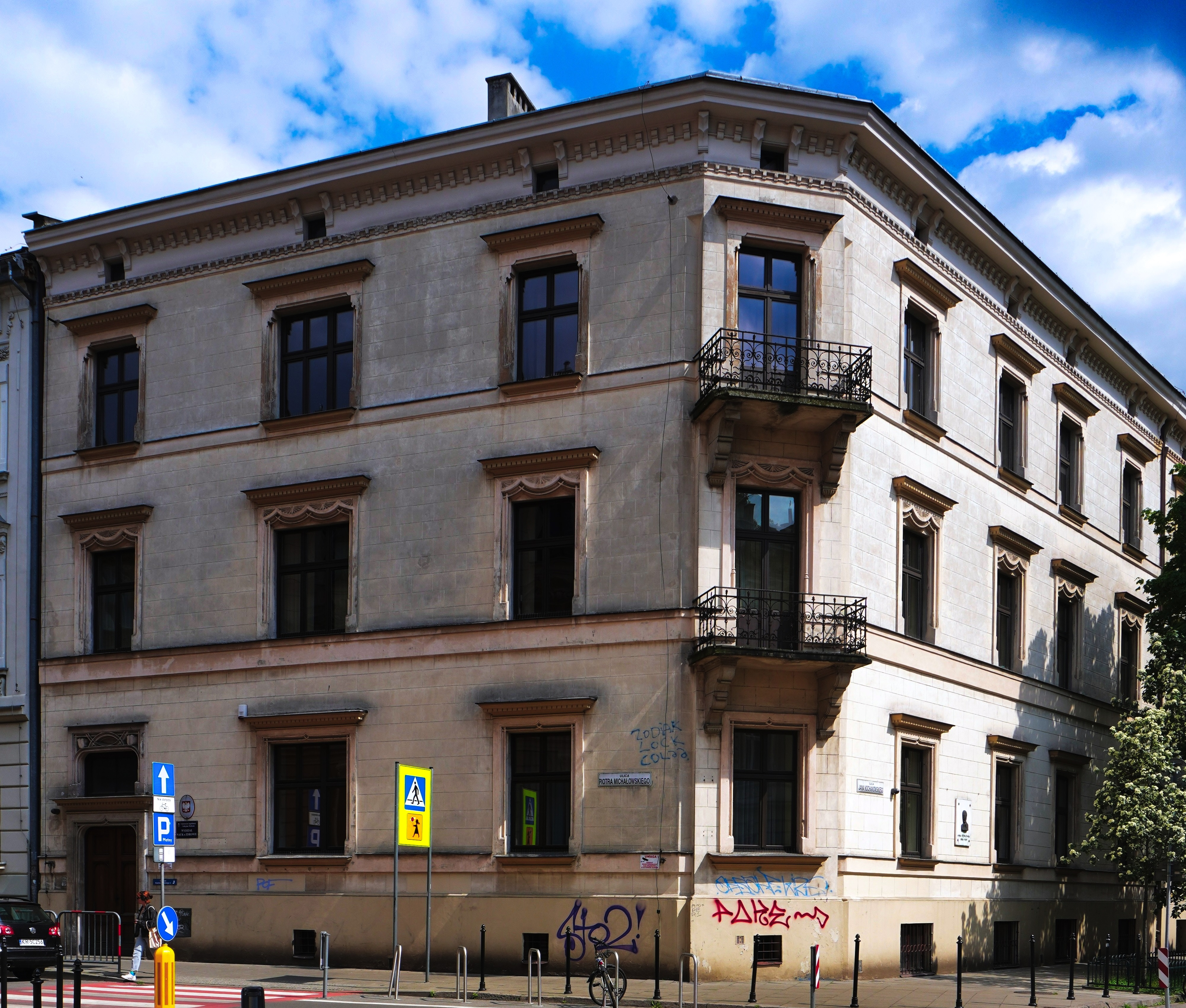
12 Piotr Michałowski Street (7 Jan Kochanowski Street)
Tenement house, currently the building of the Collegium Medicum of the Jagiellonian University, Faculty of Health Sciences (design. Kazimierz Zieliński, 1902)

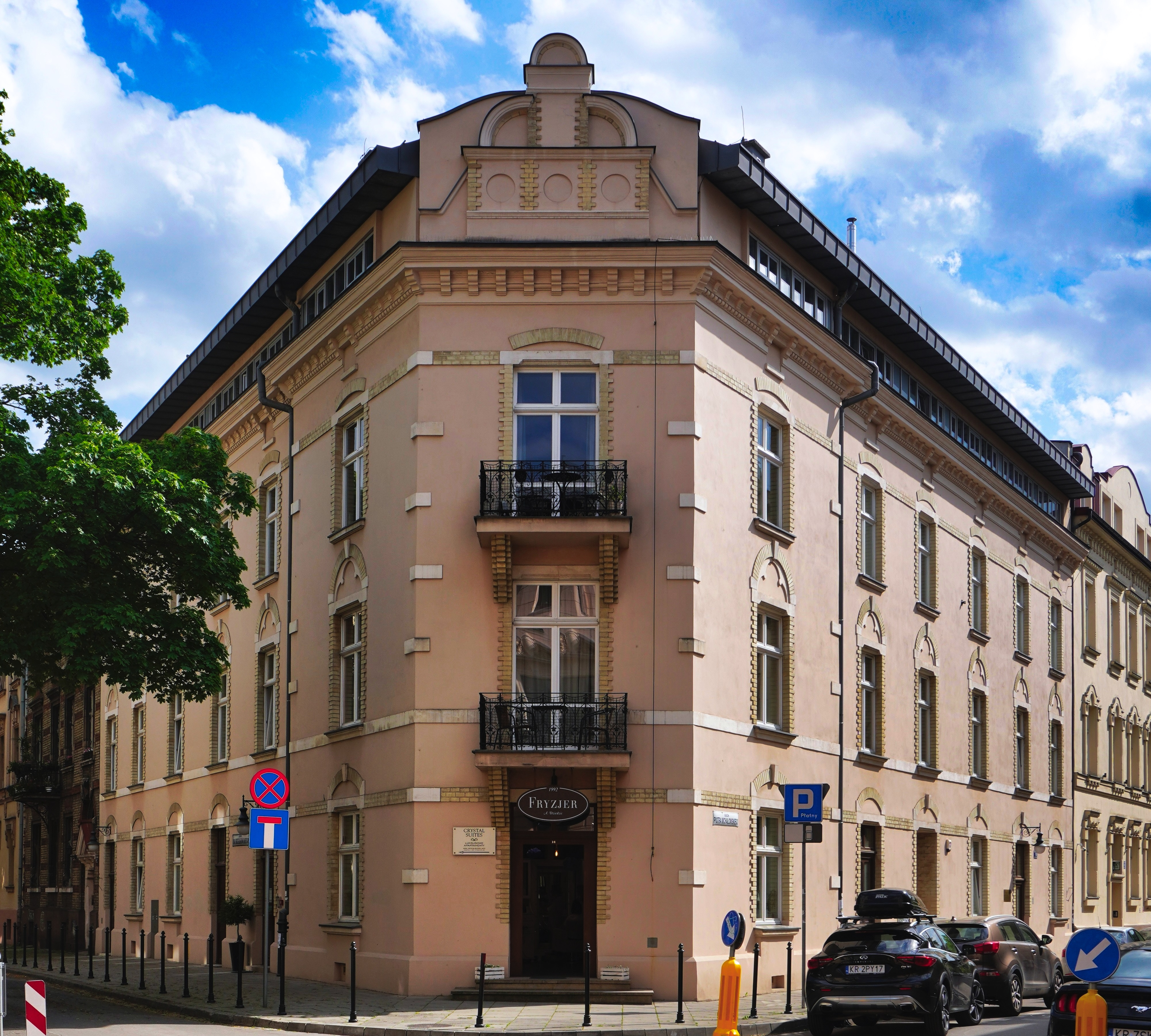
14 Piotr Michałowski Street (6 Jan Kochanowski Street)
Kamienica (1910)

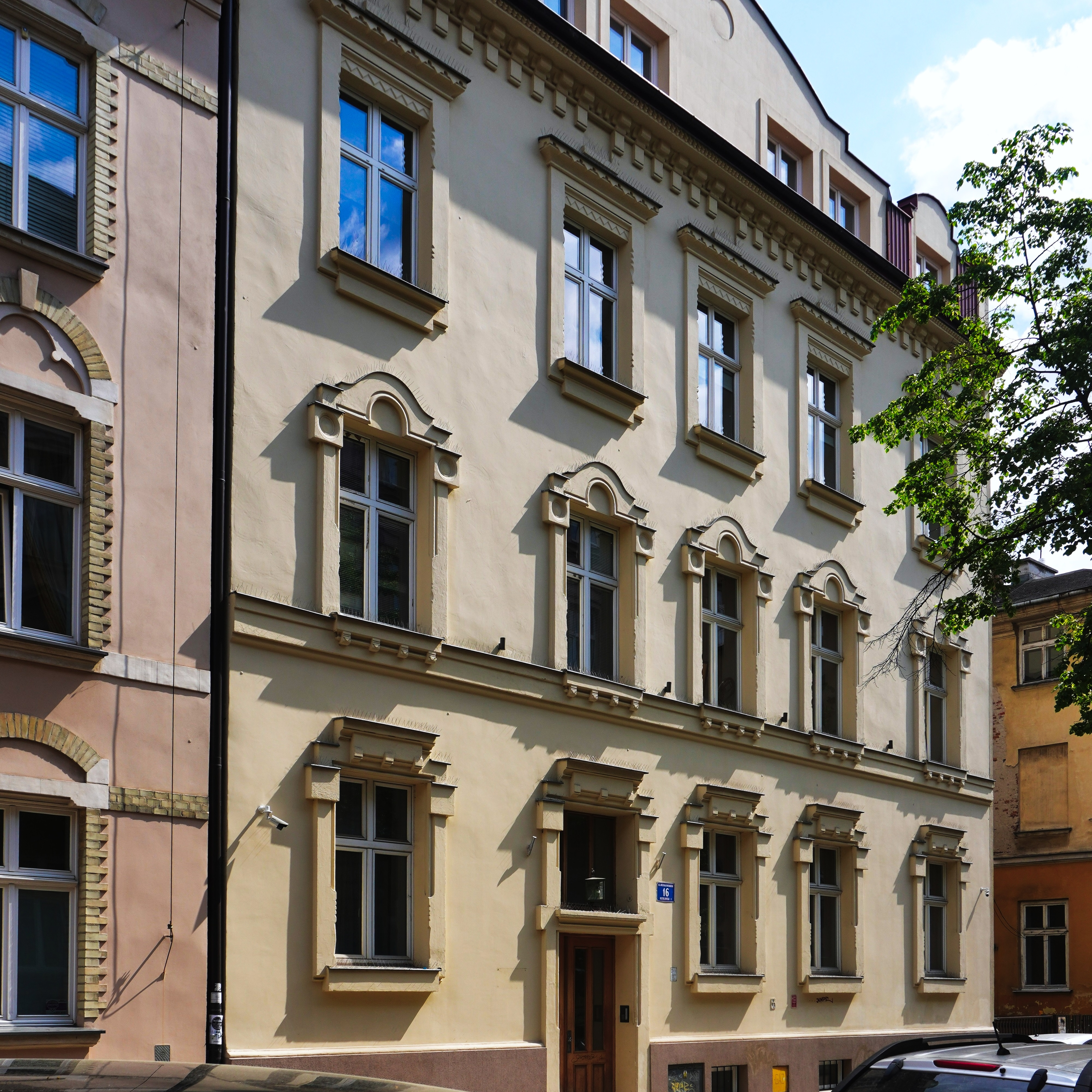
16 Piotr Michałowski Street
Kamienica (1910)
