= Dragon Tenement =

Under the Dragon Tenement
- Kamienica Pod Smokiem
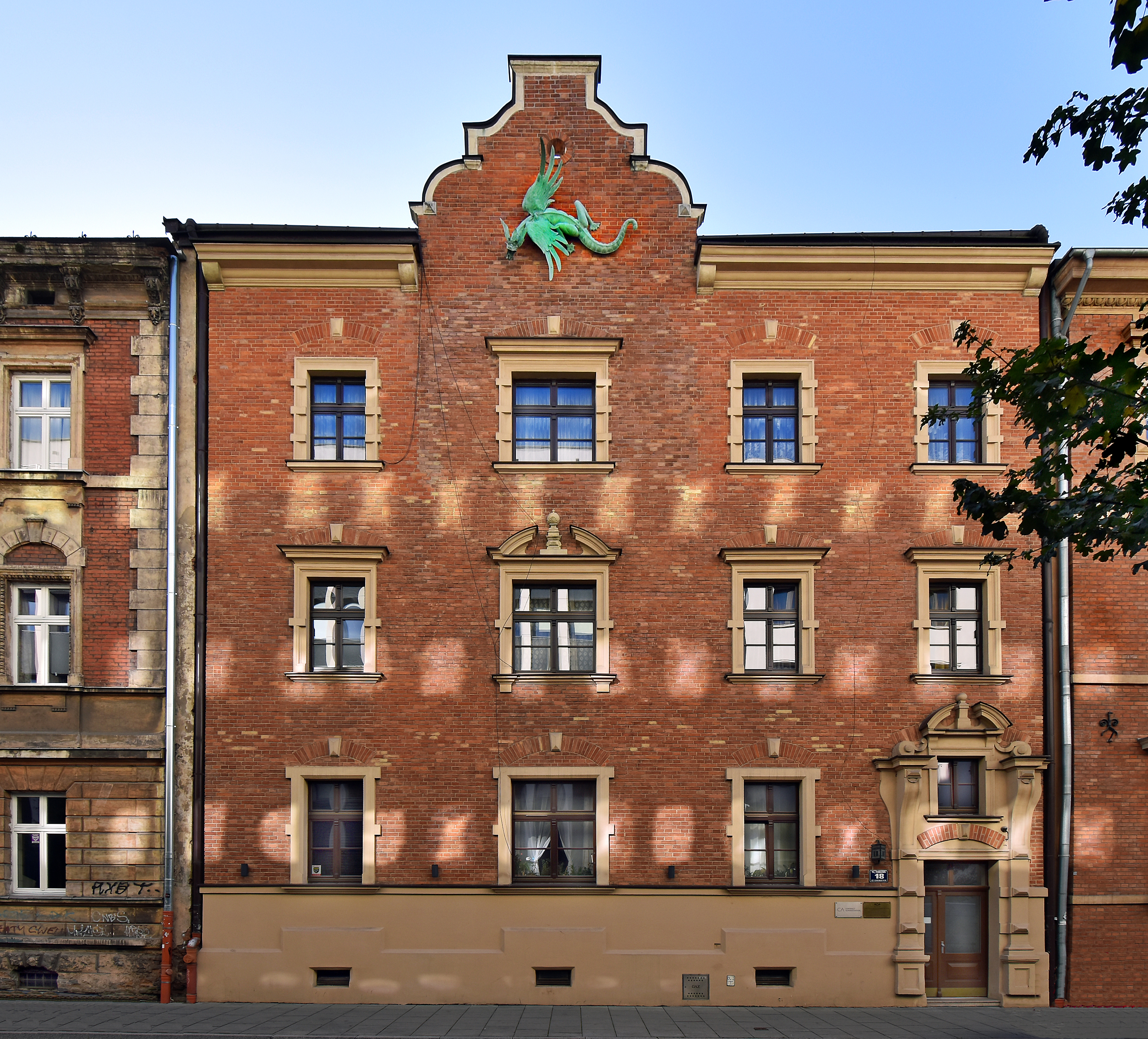

General information
- Address: 18 Smoleńsk Street
- Town or city: Kraków
- Country: Poland
- Coordinates: 50°03′30.″N 19°55′58″E
- Completed: 1887

Under the Dragon Tenement House (Polish: Kamienica Pod Smokiem) is a tenement house located at 18 Smoleńsk Street in Kraków in the District I Old Town, in the Nowy Świat neighborhood.

== History ==
The tenement was built in 1887 and was designed by Teodor Talowski. In 1898, it was expanded with an additional story based on a design by Władysław Ekielski.

On May 7, 1968, the tenement was entered into the Registry of Cultural Property. It is also entered into the municipal register of monuments of the Lesser Poland Voivodeship.

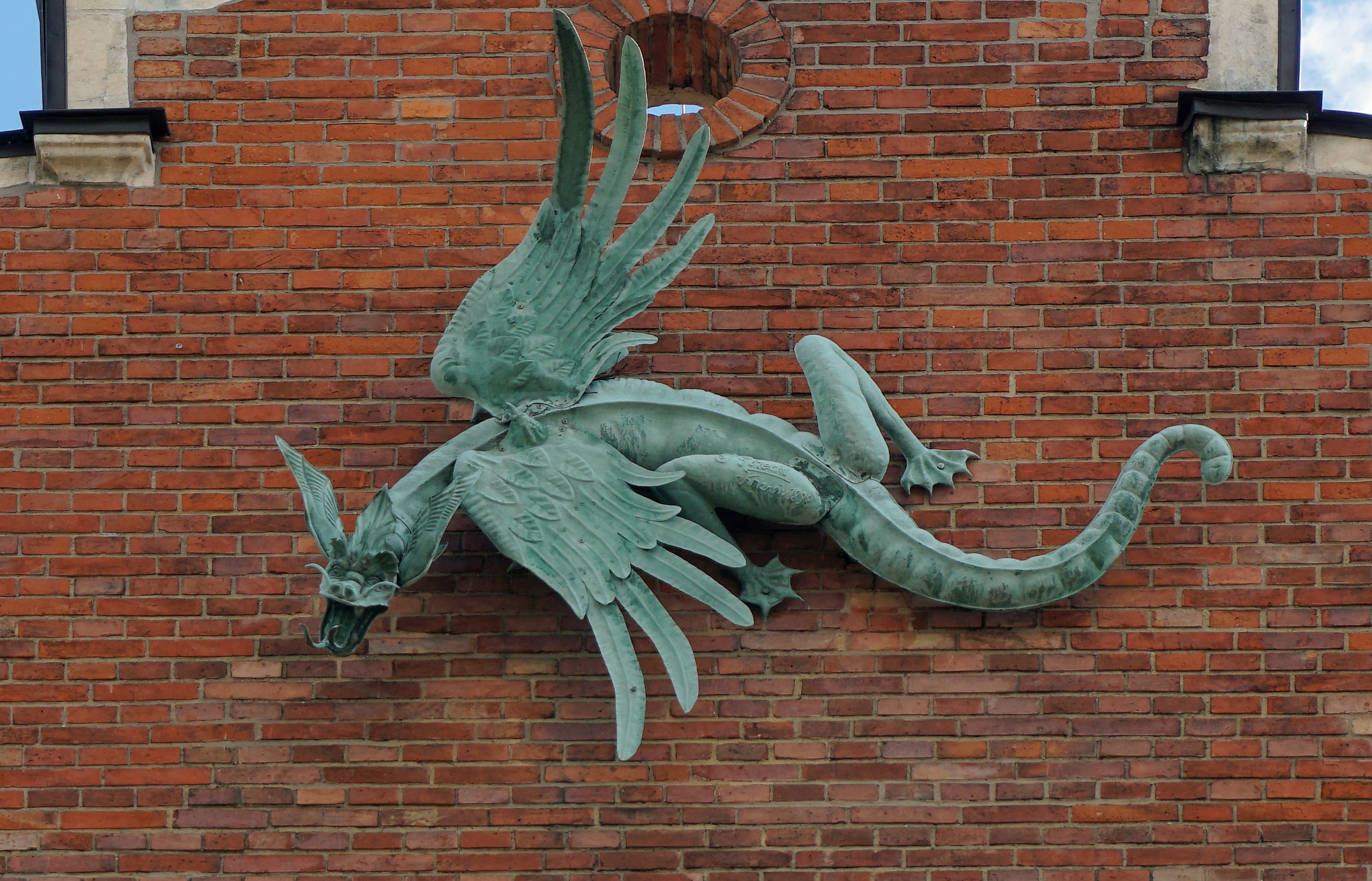
The figure of a dragon from which the tenement house's name comes from
