= 1 Czarnowiejska Street villa =

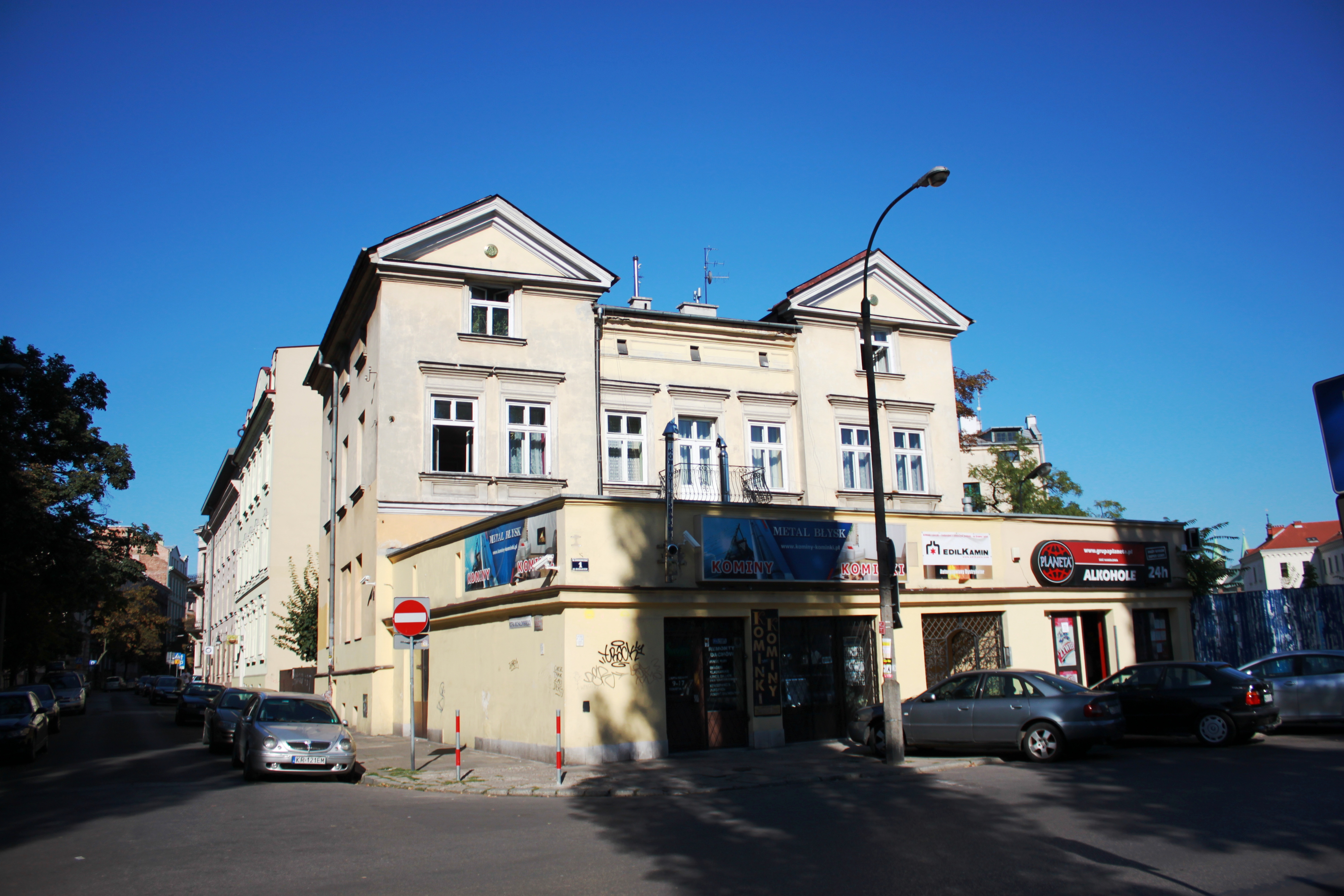
- Interactive map of the 1 Czarnowiejska Street villa area

General information
- Location: 1 Czarnowiejska Street, 18 Piotr Michałowski Street, Kraków, Poland
- Coordinates: 50°03′55.2″N 19°55′38.6″E
- Completed: 1880

1 Czarnowiejska Street villa is a villa located in Kraków in the District I Old Town at 1 Czarnowiejska Street, on the corner with 18 Piotr Michałowski Street, in Piasek.

The building was erected around 1880. Between 1927 and 1930, the villa was renovated. From 1983 to 1985, the building underwent further restoration.

On May 12, 1997, the villa was entered into the Registry of Cultural Property. It is also entered into the municipal register of monuments of the Lesser Poland Voivodeship.

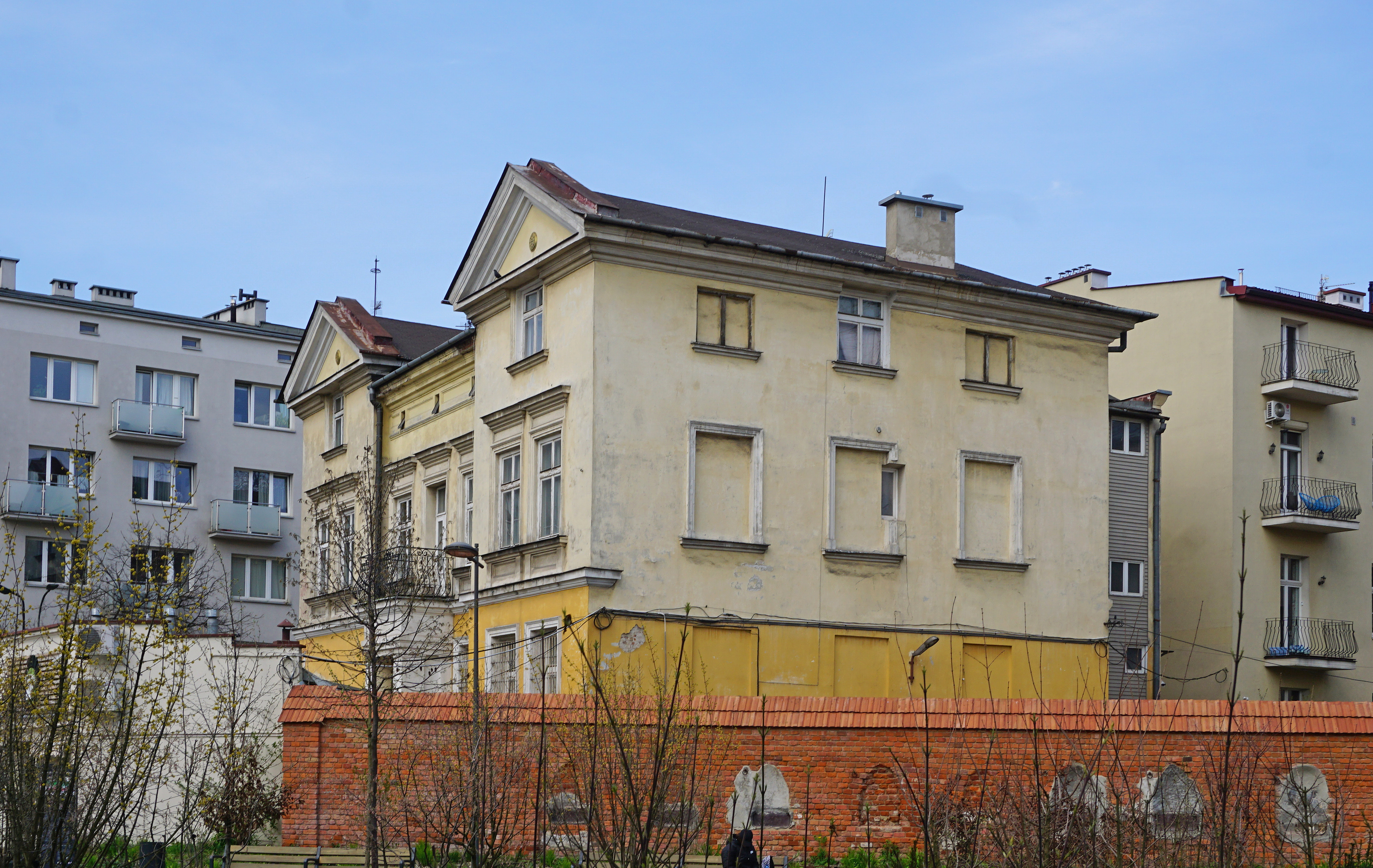
View from Wisława Szymborska Park
