= New Synagogue (Tarnów) =

Destroyed synagogue in Tarnów, Poland

- Polish: Nowa Synagoga
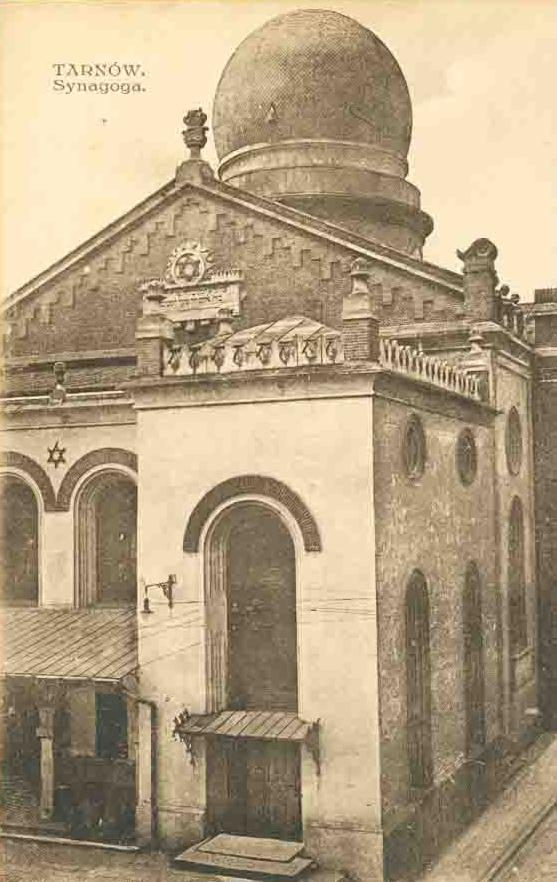
- The former synagogue, in the 1920s

- Location of the destroyed synagogue in Lesser Poland Voivodeship

Religion
- Affiliation: Judaism (former)
- Rite: Nusach Ashkenaz
- Ecclesiastical or organisational status: Synagogue (1878–1943)
- Status: Destroyed

Location
- Location: Nowa and Waryńskiego Streets, Tarnów, Lesser Poland Voivodeship
- Country: Poland
- Coordinates: 50°00′51″N 20°59′27″E

Architecture
- Architect: Władysław Ekielski
- Type: Synagogue architecture
- Style: Moorish Revival
- Groundbreaking: 1865
- Completed: 1908
- Destroyed: November 1939

Specifications
- Dome: One (maybe more)
- Materials: Brick

The New Synagogue (Polish: Nowa Synagoga), officially the New Synagogue of Tłomackie (Polish: Nowa Synagoga w Tarnowie), was a former Jewish congregation and synagogue, that was located on the corner of Nowa and Waryńskiego Streets, in Tarnów, in the Lesser Poland Voivideship of Poland.

The synagogue was designed by Władysław Ekielski in the Moorish Revival style, commenced in 1865 and completed in 1908, the lack of funds delayed timely construction. The synagogue served as a house of prayer until World War II when it was set on fire by the Nazis in November 1939. The fire lasted three days but the building did not collapse; it was blown up instead.

The only remnant of the synagogue, a pillar, was preserved as an element of the monument in the Jewish cemetery in Tarnów. In September 1993, the Committee for the Protection of Monuments of Jewish Culture from Tarnów placed a plaque on a building at the corner of Nowa and Waryńskiego Streets. The inscription, in Polish and Hebrew, reads:

“Here stood the greatest synagogue called “the New synagogue”. In November 1939 it was burned down by the Germans.”

== See also ==
- Chronology of Jewish Polish history
- History of the Jews in Poland
- List of active synagogues in Poland
