= Władysław Ekielski =

Architect active in Kraków (1855–1927)

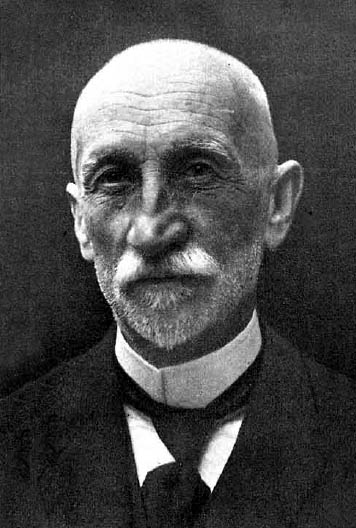
- Born: 17 February 1855; Kraków
- Died: 23 June 1927 (aged 72); Kraków
- Citizenship: Polish
- Occupation: architect

Władysław Ekielski (17 February 1855 – 23 June 1927) was a Polish architect active in Kraków, known for his work in the eclectic and modern style.

== Biography ==
Ekielski was born and raised in Kraków. He came from a bourgeois family. His father, Eustachy Ekielski, was a notary, and his mother was Elżbieta (née Sieradzka).

He attended the St Ann's Gymnasium. Between 1872 and 1876, he studied at the Institute of Technology in Kraków, and between 1876 and 1880 at the Construction Department of Vienna Polytechnic. After the graduation, he worked in the studio of Heinrich von Ferstel in Vienna.

In 1882, he came back to Kraków and began work with Tadeusz Stryjeński, initially as an employee, later as his partner. Together, they performed a number of competition projects in Kraków, some of which has been implemented, including the Wołodkowicze Palace in the 1880s, the Pusłowscy Palace in 1886 and the Aleksander Lubomirski Foundation Hospice (currently the main building of the Kraków University of Economics) in 1893.

In 1886, Ekielski obtained building license and started teaching as a lecturer at the Kraków Municipal School of Applied Arts (Miejska Szkoła Przemysłu Artystycznego). He was also a teacher of drawing at the k.k. College of Industry in Kraków (Wyższa Szkoła Przemysłowa).

He made projects of tenement houses at Karmelicka Street 42, Studencka Street 14, Szpitalna Street 4, Grodzka Street 26 and Piłsudskiego Street 14. At Piłsudskiego Street 40, he designed his own house called A House With Two Fronts. He created Willa Julia in Podgórze in 1903, and Suski House at Grodzka Street 24–26 in 1906–1909. He carried out architectural work on the construction of the Adam Mickiewicz Monument at the Kraków Main Square, and completed the construction of the New Synagogue in Tarnów.

In the course of renovations carried out since 1895 at the presbytery and the nave of the Franciscan Church in Kraków, he made a discovery of the original plan of the building. Later, he offered Stanisław Wyspiański to execute the polychromy of the interior of the Church.

In 1900, he co-created and became the editor-in-chief of the monthly magazine The Architect (Architekt). In the years 1904–1906, together with Wyspiański, he developed a design for the reconstruction of the Wawel Hill, known as Akropolis. This project has never been implemented. In 1902, together with Antoni Tuch, he set up a stained-glass plant, which in time was transformed into the Kraków Stained-Glass Plant S. G. Żeleński (Krakowski Zakład Witrażów S. G. Żeleński).

Starting 1918, Ekielski was a professor at the Jan Matejko Academy of Fine Arts.

On 2 May 1922, he was awarded the Officer's Cross of the Order of Polonia Restituta.

In 1896, he married Zofia Stiasny. They had three sons and two daughters. He died in 1927, and was buried at the Rakowicki Cemetery.

== Projects (selection) ==
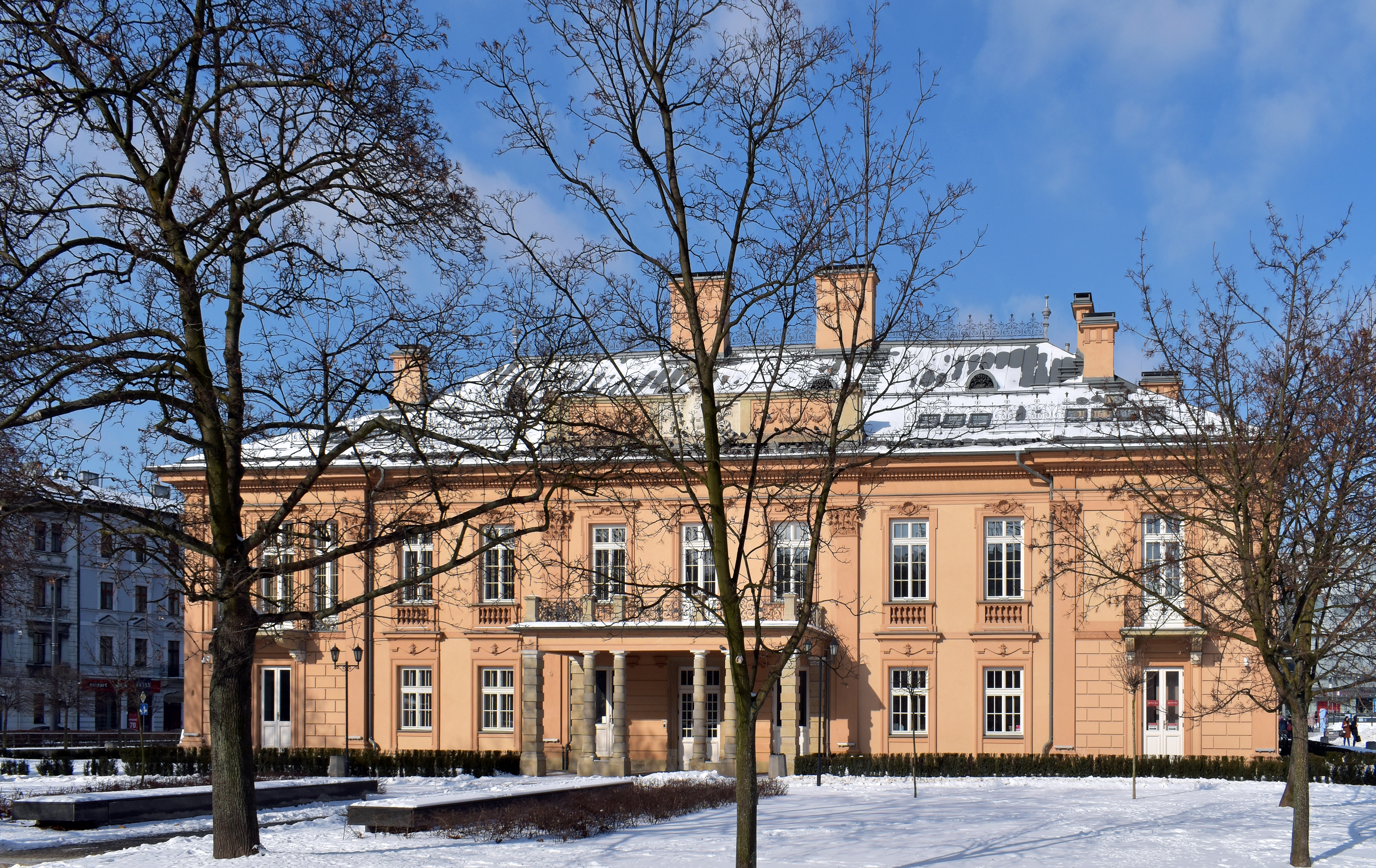
Wołodkowicz Palace (1880)
4 Lubicz Street, Kraków

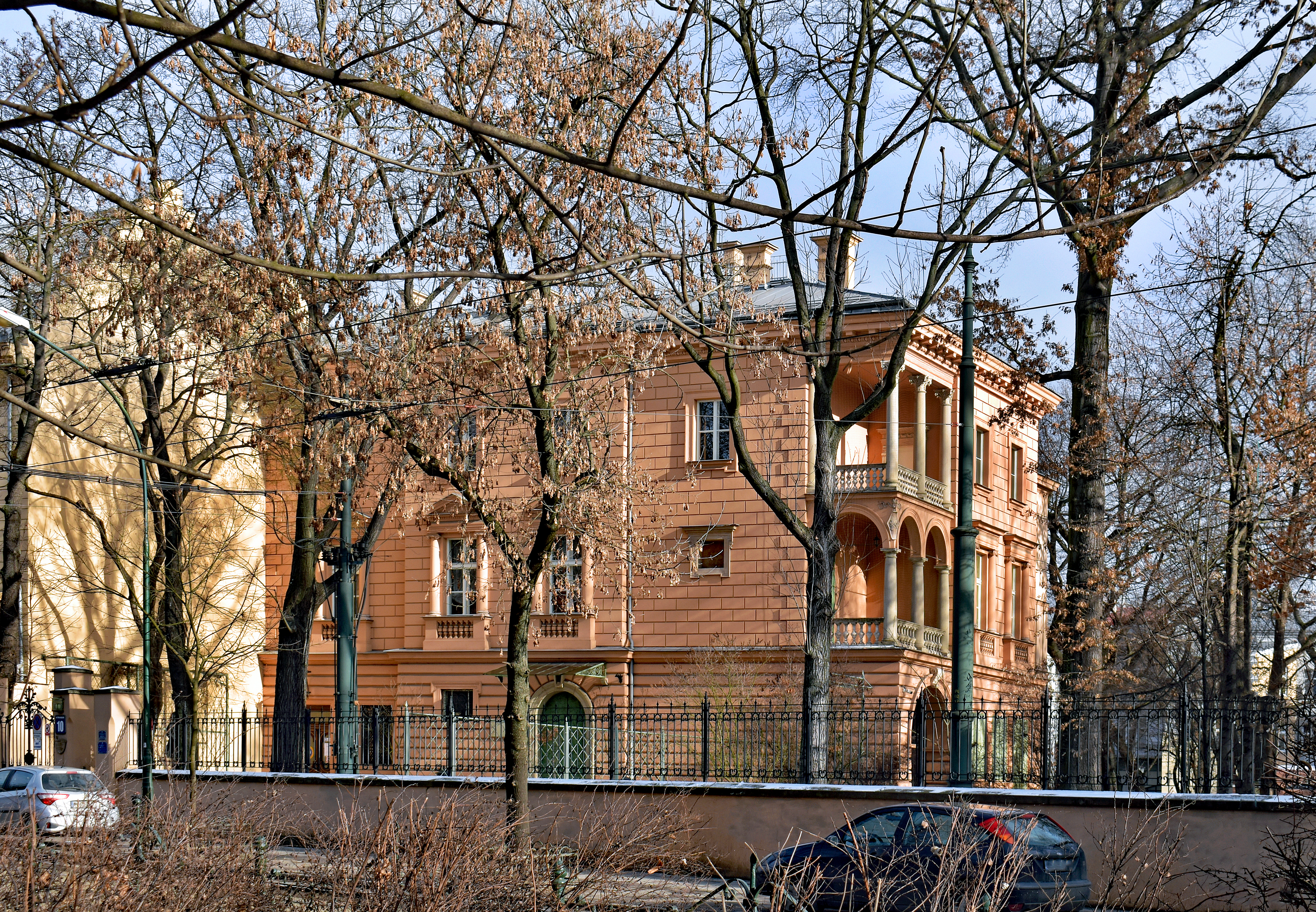
Pusłowscy Palace (1886)
10 Westerplatte Street, Kraków

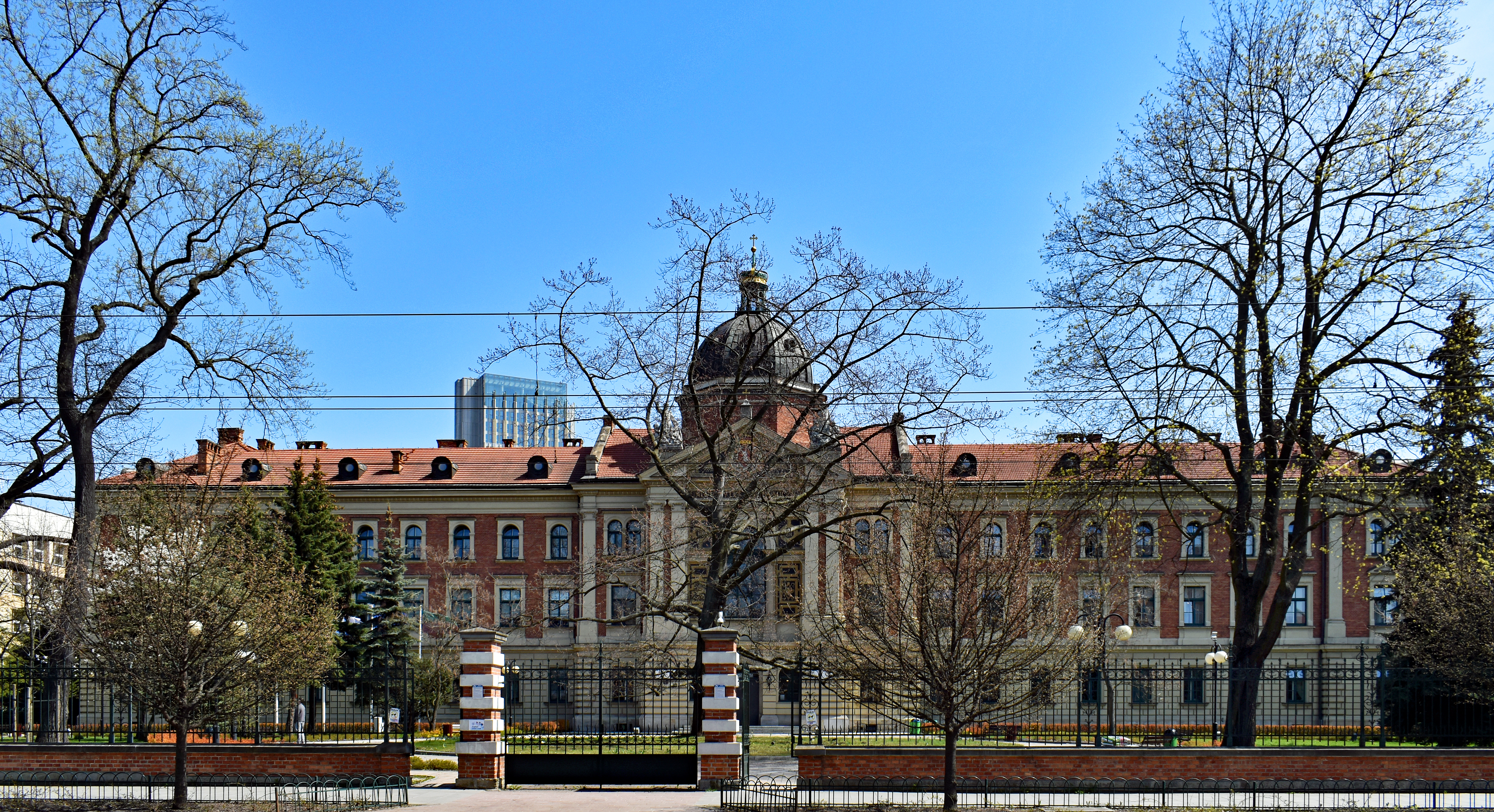
Aleksander Lubomirski Foundation Hospice (1893)
27 Rakowicka Street, Kraków

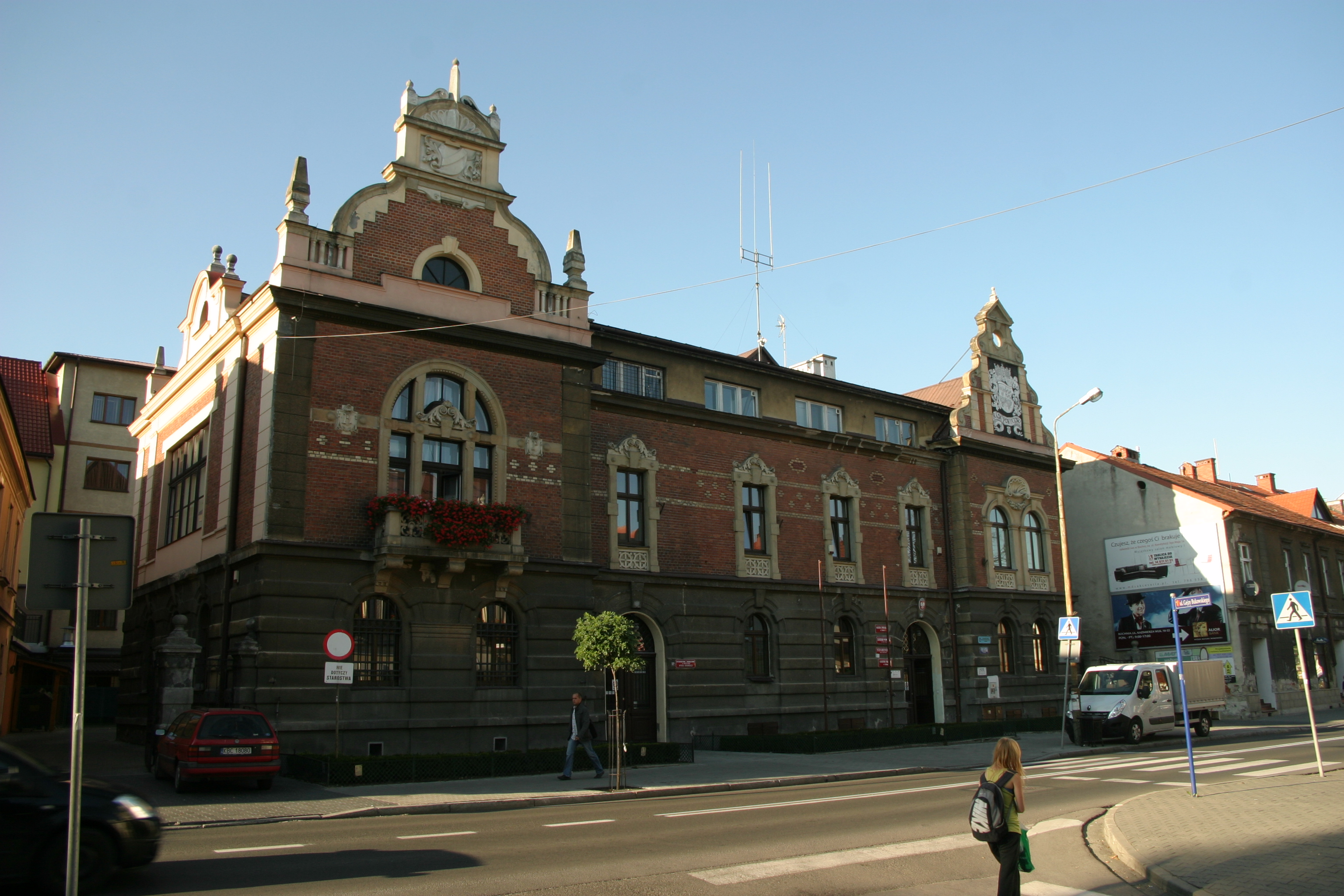
Powiat (County) office (1893)
31 Kazimierza Wielkiego Str Bochnia

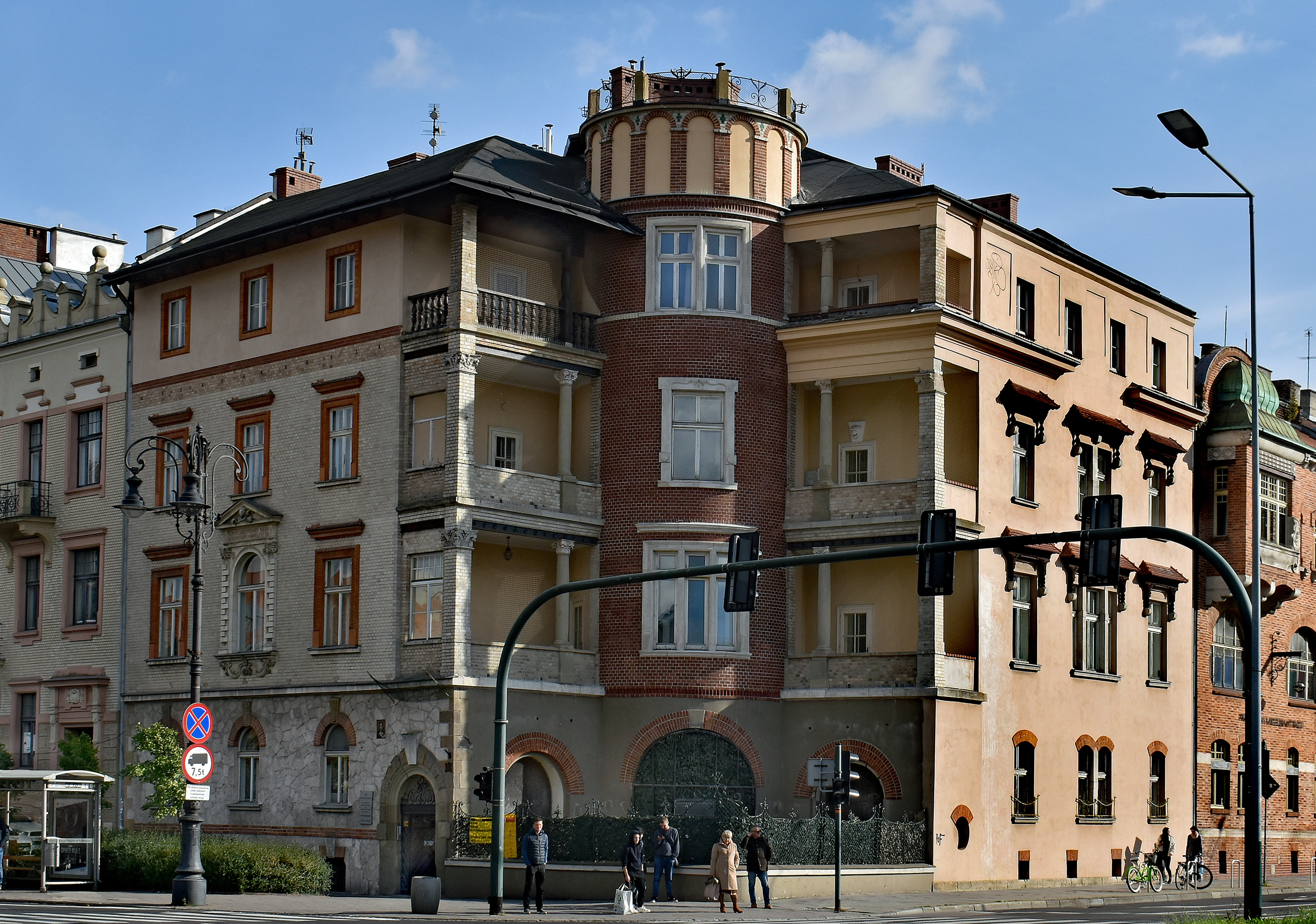
The House With Two Fronts (1898)
40 Piłsudskiego Street, Kraków

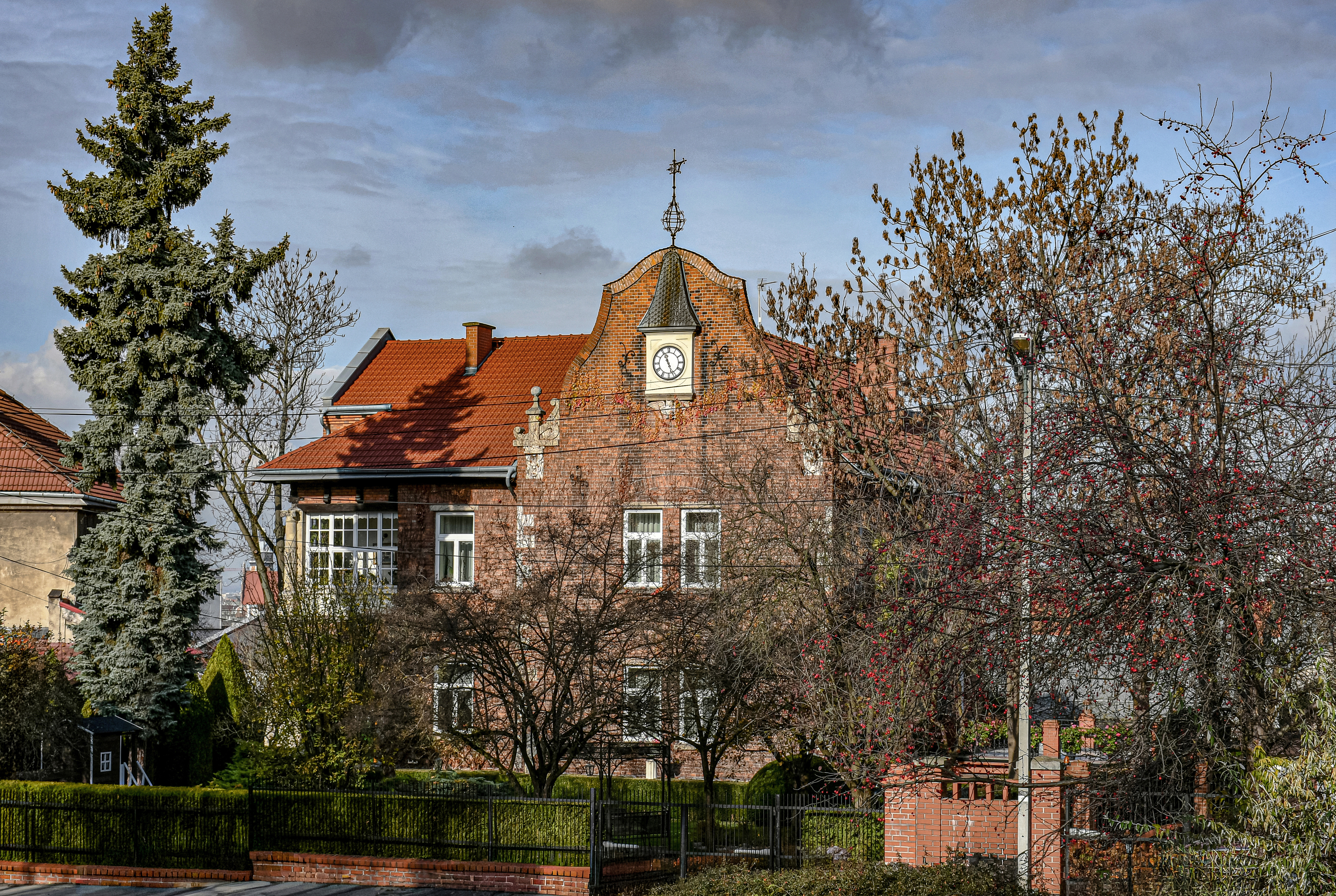
Willa Julia (1903)
2 Lasoty Square, Kraków

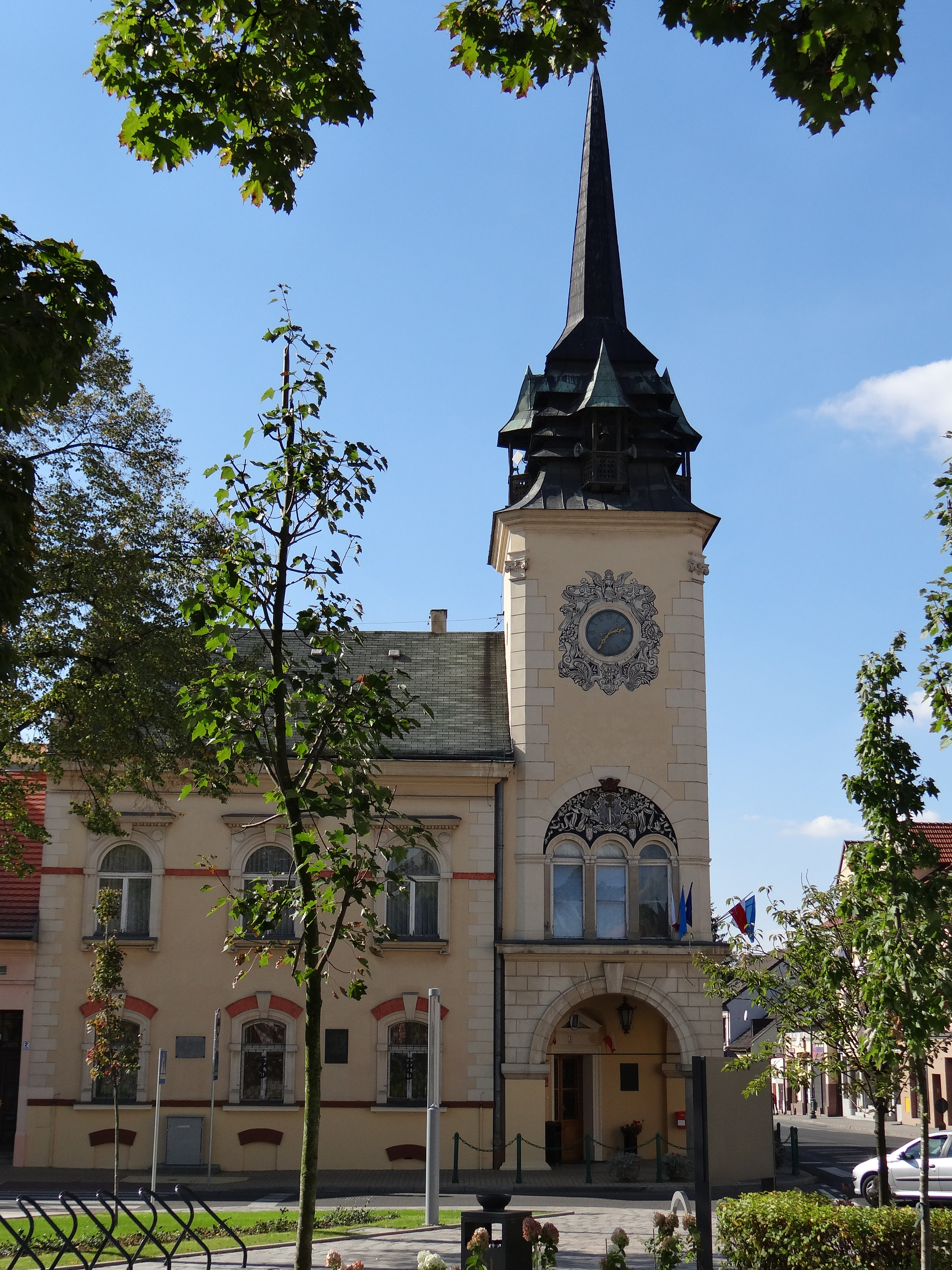
City hall (1904)
2 Rynek (Market Square), Skawina

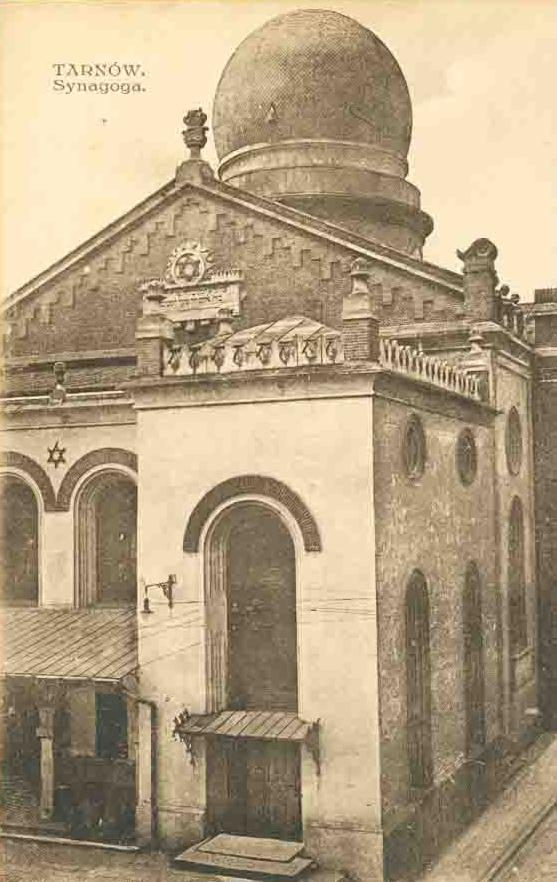
New Synagogue (1908)
Tarnów (destroyed by the Germans in 1939)

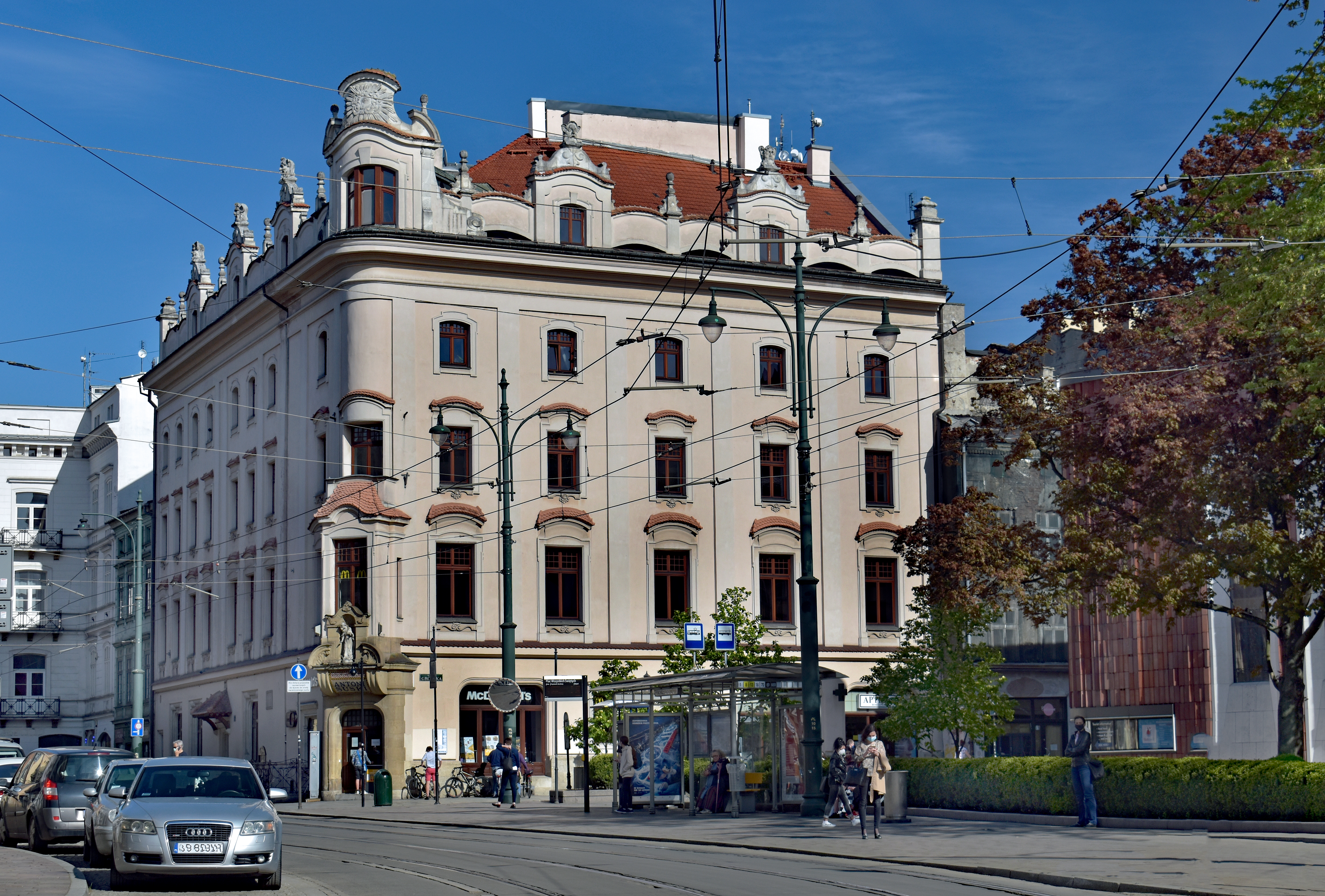
Suski Tenement House (1906)
24–26 Grodzka Street, Kraków

== Written works ==
- Zadania i stanowisko urzędu budownictwa miejskiego w Krakowie (in Polish). Kraków: Published by the author. 1895.
- Akropolis: pomysł zabudowania Wawelu obmyśleli Stanisław Wyspiański i Władysław Ekielski w latach 1904-1906 (in Polish). Kraków: Drukarnia Uniwersytetu Jagiellońskiego. 1908.
- Odbudowa polskiej wsi: odczyt wygłoszony na kursach ekonomiczno-społecznych Instytutu Ekonomicznego N.K.N. (in Polish). Kraków: Nakładem Centralnego Biura Wydawnictw N. K. N. 1916.
- "Wspomnienie o Wyspiańskim: z teki pośmiertnej arch. W. Ekielskiego". Rzeczy Piękne (in Polish). 1–12: 3–11. 1932.
