= Józef Szujski Street =

Street in Kraków, Poland

Józef Szujski street
Kraków
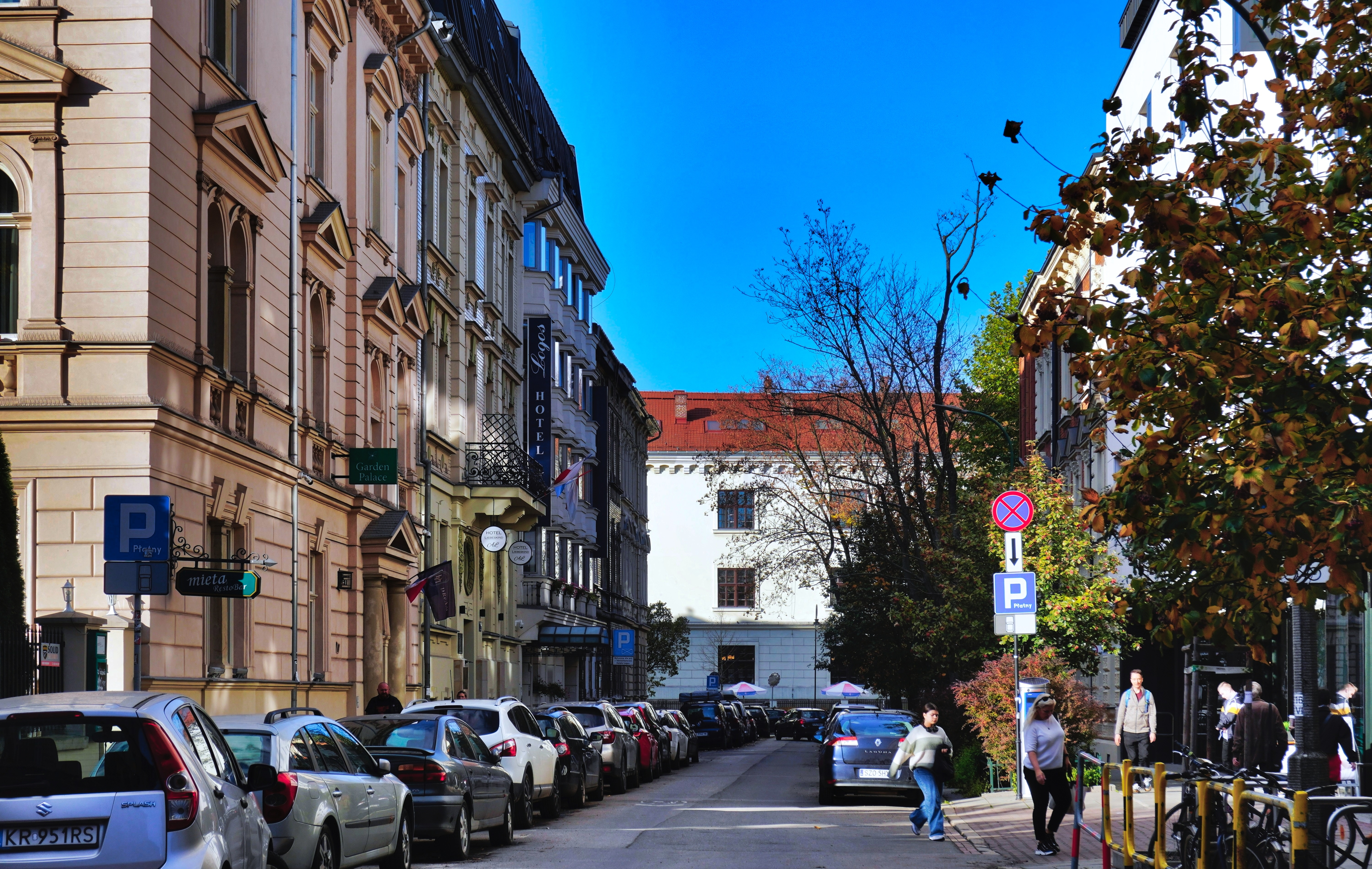
- View north from the intersection with Krupnicza Street
- Interactive map of Józef Szujski street
- Part of: Kraków Old Town
- Owner: City of Kraków
- Location: Kraków, Poland

Józef Szujski Street is a street in Kraków, in District I Old Town, in Piasek.

It connects Rajska Street with Krupnicza Street. It is a single-carriageway road.

== History ==
The street was laid out in its current form at the end of the 1890s.

In 1903, the Krakow City Council gave the street its current name to commemorate Józef Szujski, a Polish historian, one of the Krakow stańczyks, publicist, poet, and prose writer. He was a co-founder of "Przegląd Polski" and the first Secretary General of the Academy of Learning in Kraków.

== Buildings ==
- Józef Szujski Street (14–16 Rajska Street) – Building of the former Common School, circa 1865.
- 1 Józef Szujski Street (17 Krupnicza Street) – Tenement house. Designed by Karol Knaus, 1889.
- 2 Józef Szujski Street (13–15 Krupnicza Street) – Building of the former Girls' School. Designed by Józef Ochmański, 1864–1868.
- 3 Józef Szujski Street – Tenement house. Designed by Beniamin Torbe, 1906–1907.
- 6 Józef Szujski Street – Tenement house, 1897.
- 7 Józef Szujski Street – Tenement house, circa 1906.
- 9 Józef Szujski Street – Tenement house, circa 1909.
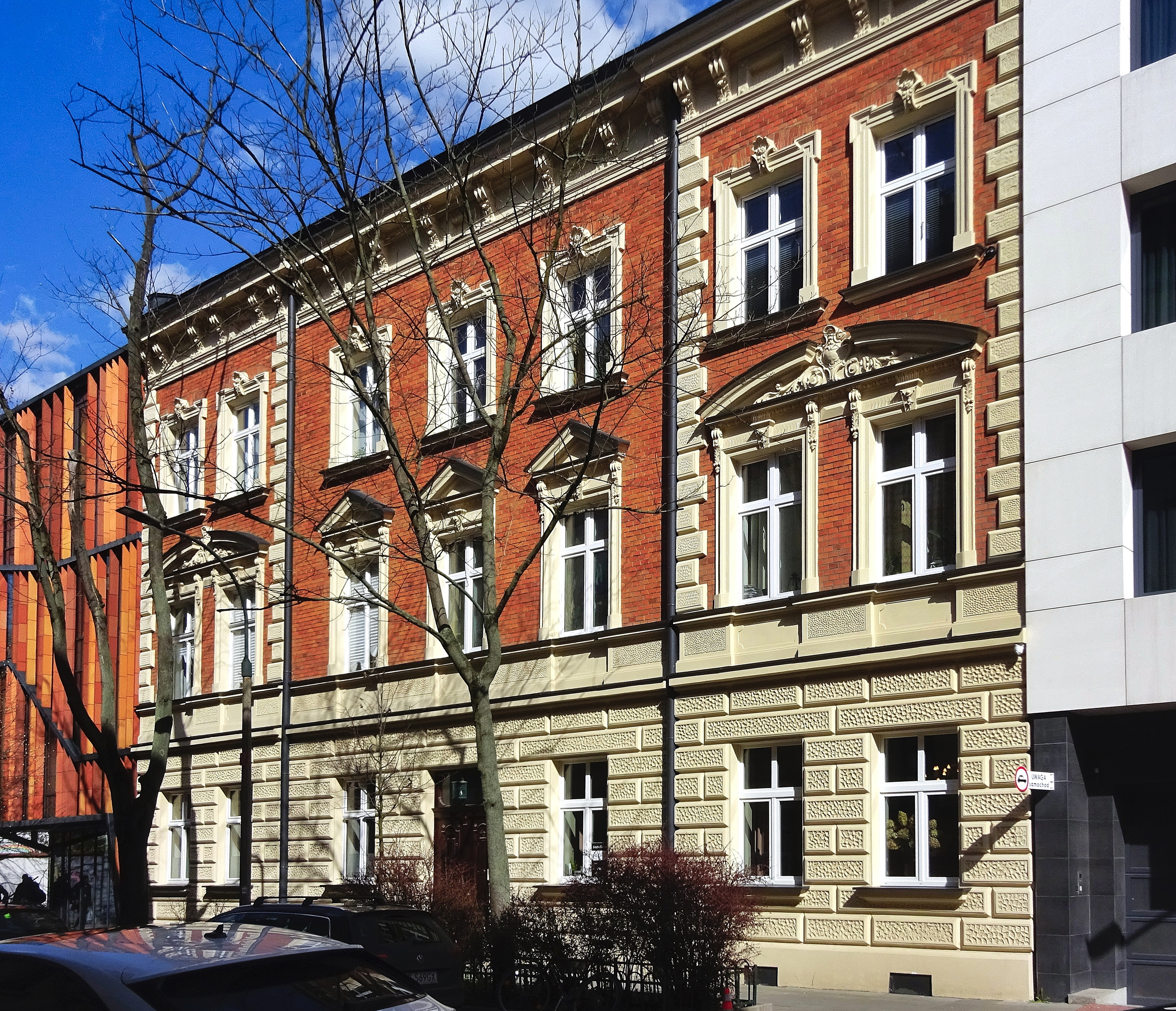
6 Józef Szujski Street
Tenement house (1897)
