= Czysta Street =

Street in Kraków, Poland

Czysta street
Kraków
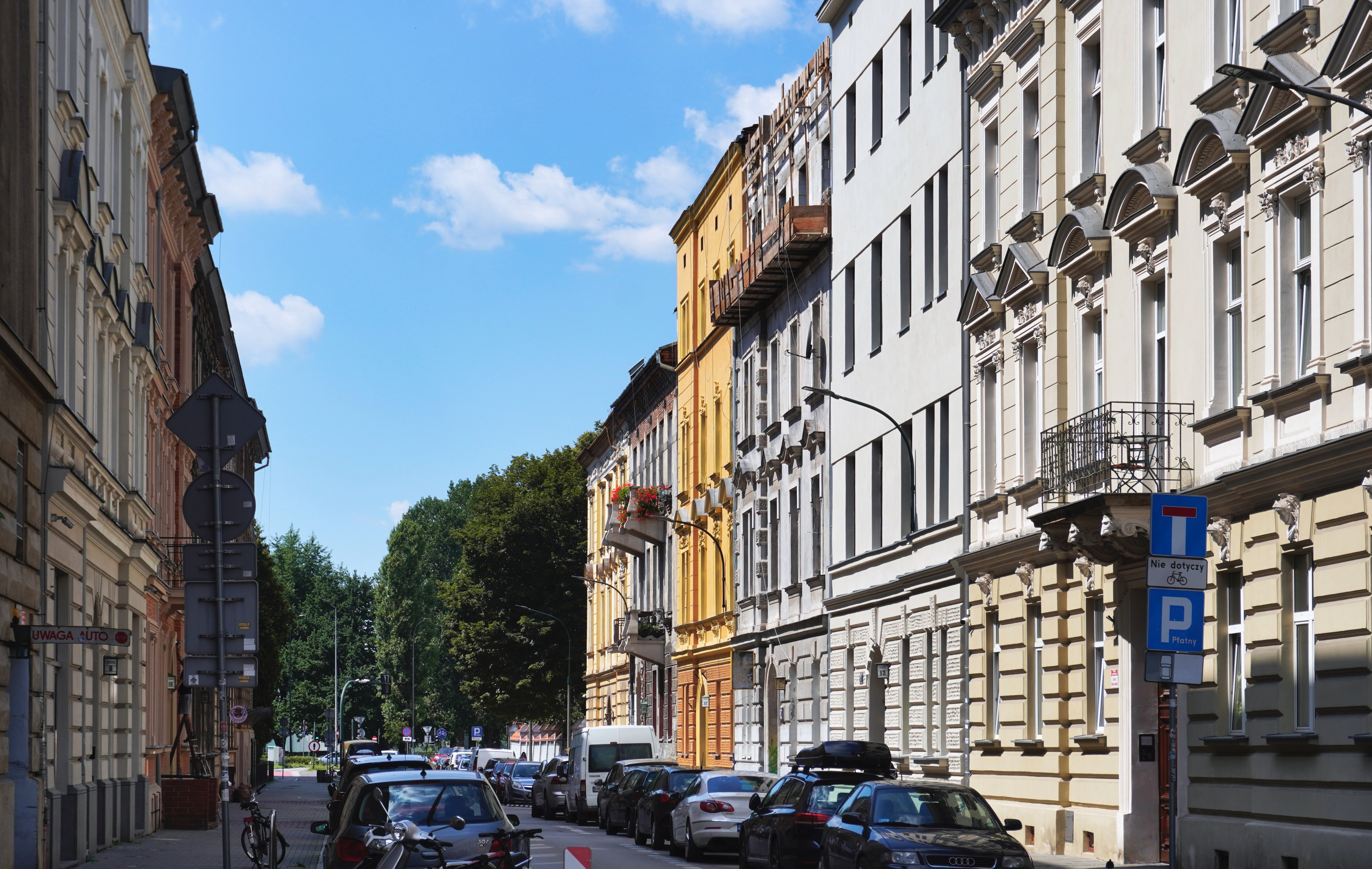
- View of the street
- Interactive map of Czysta street
- Part of: Kraków Old Town district
- Owner: City of Kraków
- Location: Kraków, Poland

Czysta Street in Kraków is a street in Kraków, in District I Old Town, in Piasek.

It runs from Dolnych Młynów Street and Mieczysław Kuznowicz Square in the east to Adam Mickiewicz Avenue (without a physical road connection) in the west.

== History ==
The street was laid out in its current form in 1891. At that time, the area belonged to Tomasz Pryliński, an architect and the author of, among other projects, the redesign of the Cloth Hall. The street's name was assigned in 1892. Earlier proposed names included "Mączna" or "Młynarska," derived from the nearby Dolne Młyny (Lower Mills) along the now non-existent branch of the Rudawa River – the Młynówka Królewska (Royal Millstream), as well as "Fabryczna," referring to a nearby cigar factory.

This area was once home to Kraków's oldest Jewish cemetery, which may have even encompassed the site of the current main building of the AGH University of Science and Technology. It was first mentioned in 1311. Its location here was likely due to the proximity of Kraków's first Jewish quarter on St. Anna Street (formerly known as Jewish Street). After the relocation of Kraków's Jews to Kazimierz in 1495, the cemetery gradually lost its significance. The last recorded mention of it dates back to 1599.

== Buildings ==
The street's development is uniform, compact, and almost exclusively residential. It primarily consists of tenement houses, mostly two-story, some later extended, built in the 1890s and early 20th century. Their facades feature historicism with simple architectural details, while some are in the modernist style.

- 1 Czysta Street (4 Dolnych Młynów Street) – A historic tenement in the Neo-Baroque style. Designed by Stefan Ertel, 1893.
- 3 Czysta Street – Tenement house in the Neo-Baroque style. Designed by Leopold Tlachna, 1898.
- 5 Czysta Street – Tenement house in the Neo-Baroque style. Designed by Kazimierz Henisz, 1892.
- 7 Czysta Street – Tenement house in the Neo-Baroque style. Designed by Kazimierz Henisz, 1890.
- 8 Czysta Street – Tenement house in the historicist style. Designed by Leopold Tlachna, 1899.
- 9 Czysta Streeta – Tenement house in the modernist style. The only building on the street constructed after World War II.
- 10 Czysta Street – Tenement house in the historicist style. Built in 1899.
- 11 Czysta Street – Tenement house in the historicist style. Designed by Karol Janecki and J. Mroczek, 1893.
- 12 Czysta Street – Tenement house in the historicist style. Designed by Karol Scharoch, 1898.
- 13 Czysta Street – Tenement house. Built in 1900.
- 14 Czysta Street – Tenement house. Designed by Rajmund Meus and Bronisław Górski, 1893.
- 15 Czysta Street – Tenement house in the historicist style. Designed by Leopold Tlachna, 1891.
- 16 Czysta Street – Tenement house in the historicist style. Designed by Beniamin Torbe, 1906.
- 17 Czysta Street – Tenement house in the historicist style. Designed by Leopold Tlachna, 1902.
- 18 Czysta Street (17 Adam Mickiewicz Avenue) – Former building of the Veterinary and Forensic Medicine Institute. Currently the seat of the Department of Microbiology at the Collegium Medicum of the Jagiellonian University. Designed by Józef Sare, 1910–1912. The only building set back from the street's building line.
- 19 Czysta Street – Tenement house with Art Nouveau details (wrought iron balcony railings) and a ground floor decorated with natural broken stones. Designed by Aleksy Kowalski, 1896–1897. Renovated in 1905.
- 20 Czysta Street – Tenement house in the Neo-Baroque style. Designed by Leopold Tlachna, 1899.
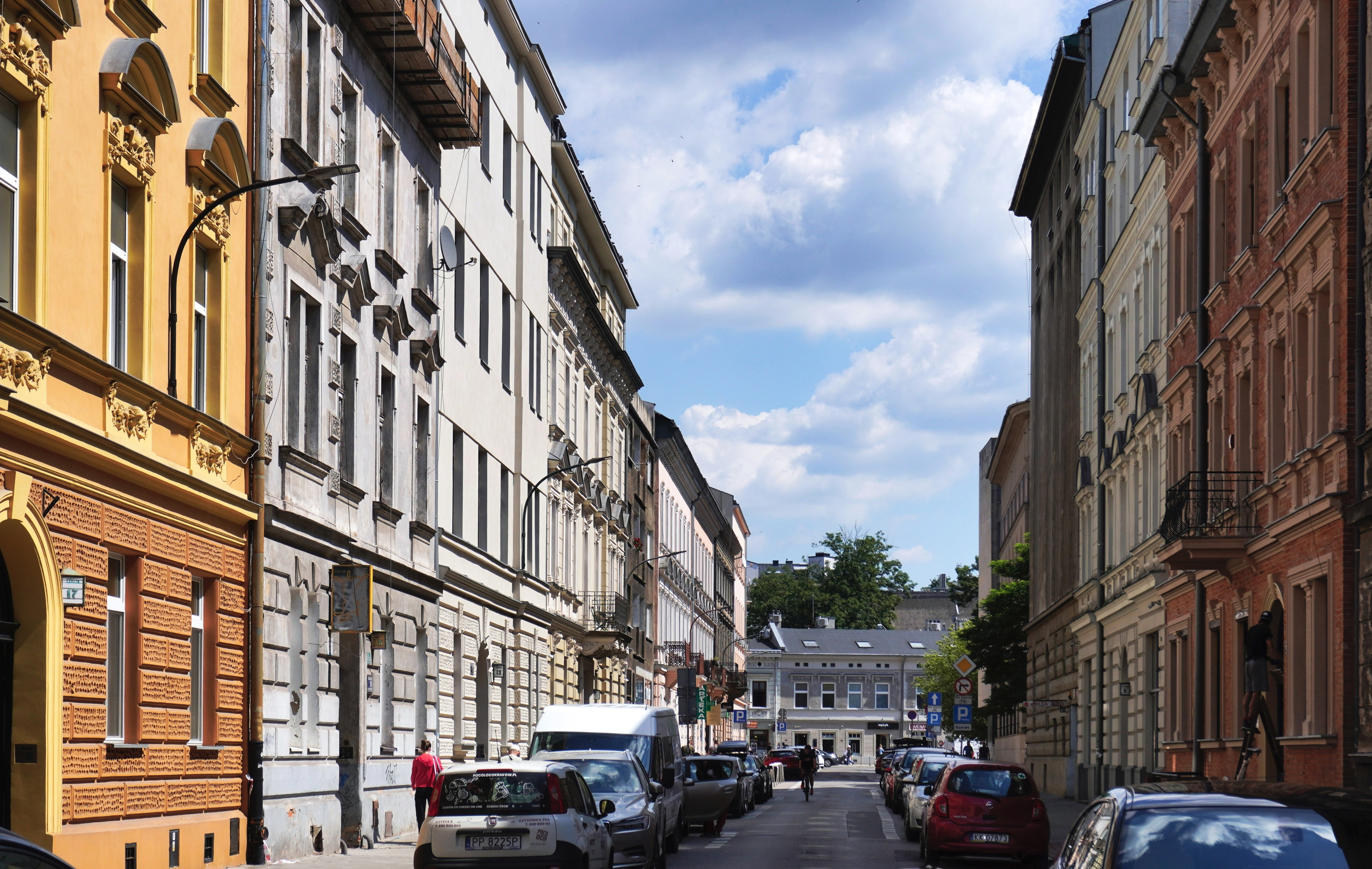
View from the west, from Adam Mickiewicz Avenue

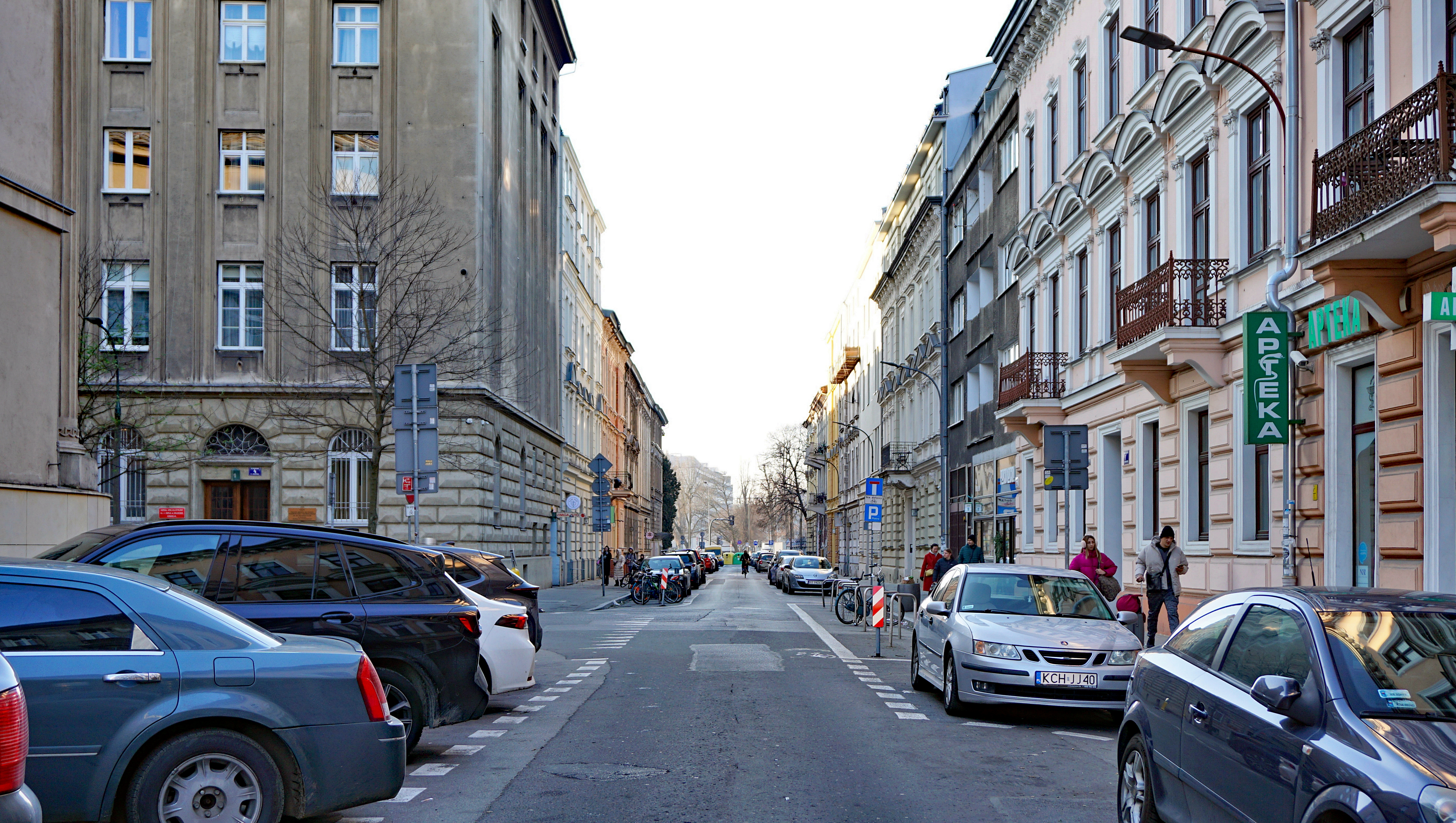
View to the west at the intersection with Skarbowa Street

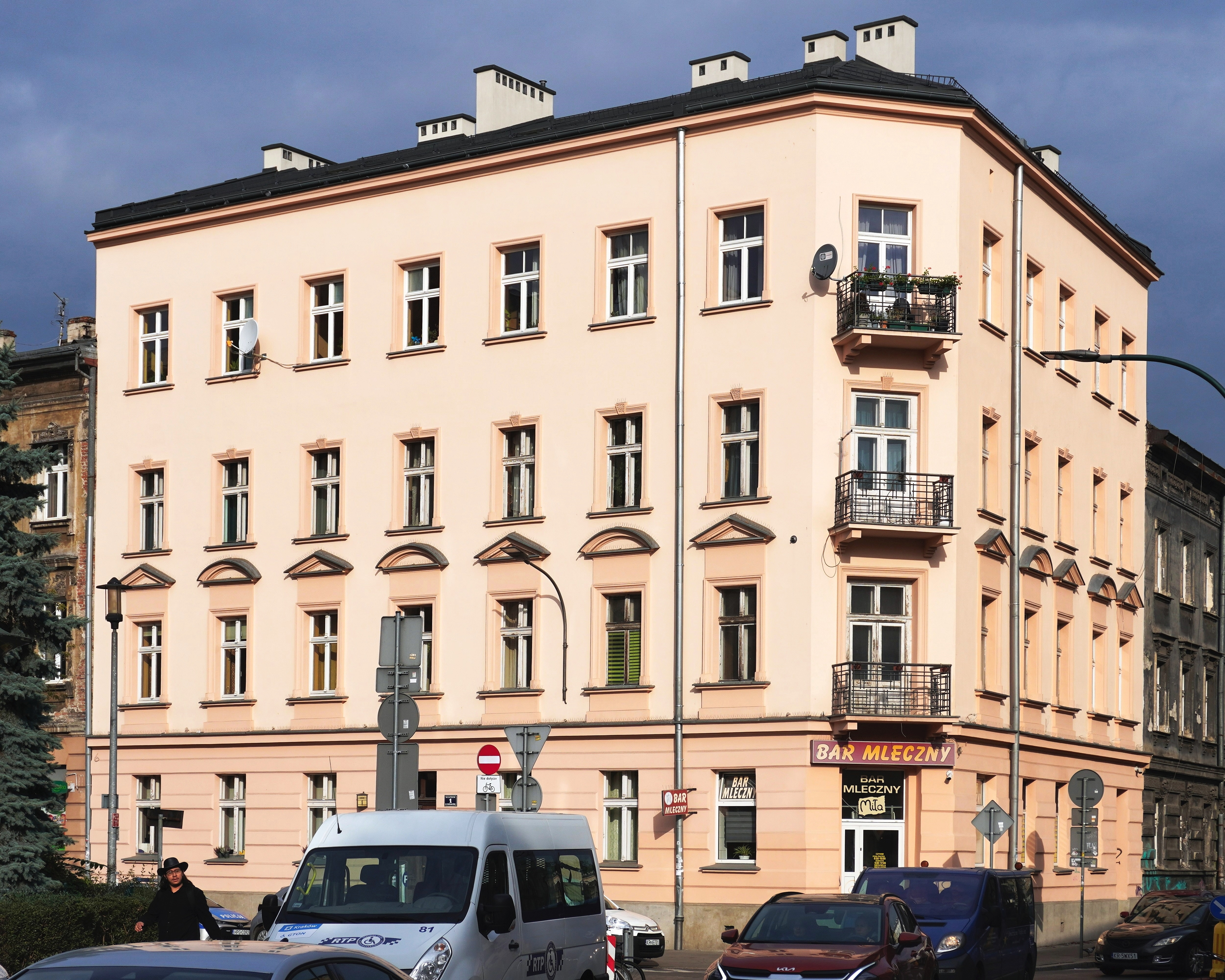
1 Czysta Street (4 Dolnych Młynów Street)
Tenement house (design. Stefan Ertel, 1893)

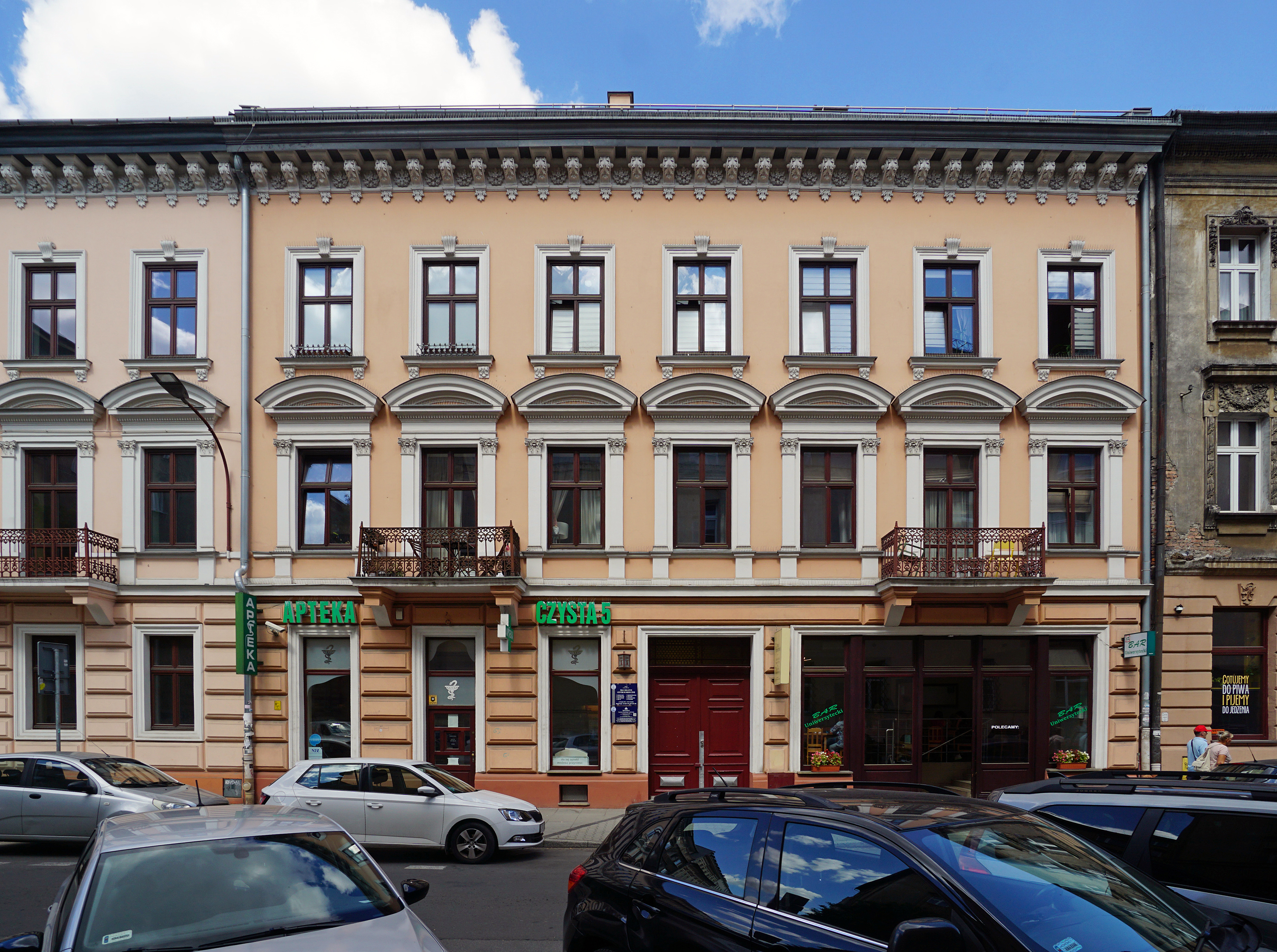
5 Czysta Street
Tenement house (design. Kazimierz Henisz, 1892)

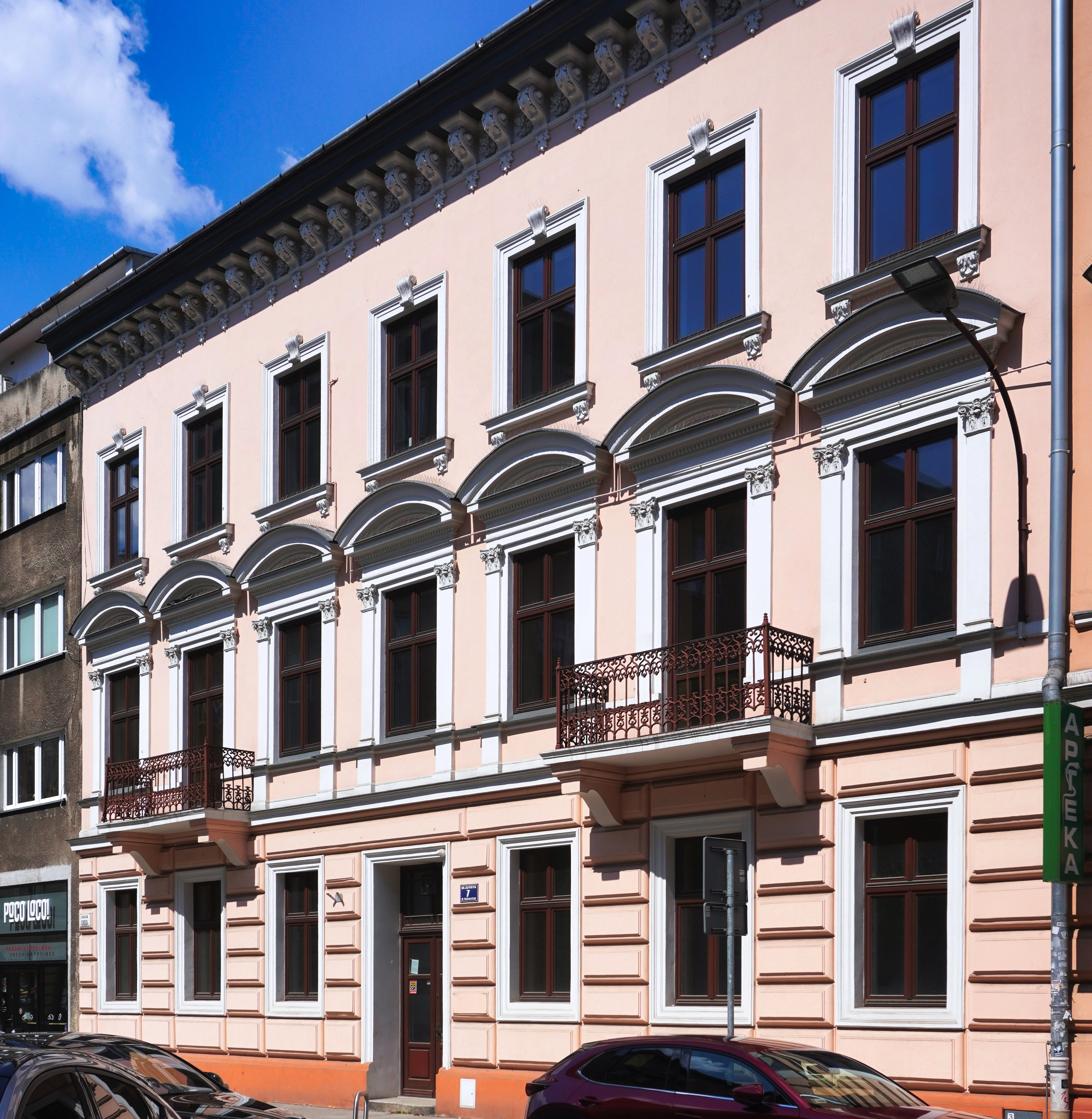
7 Czysta Street
Tenement house (design. Kazimierz Henisz, 1890)

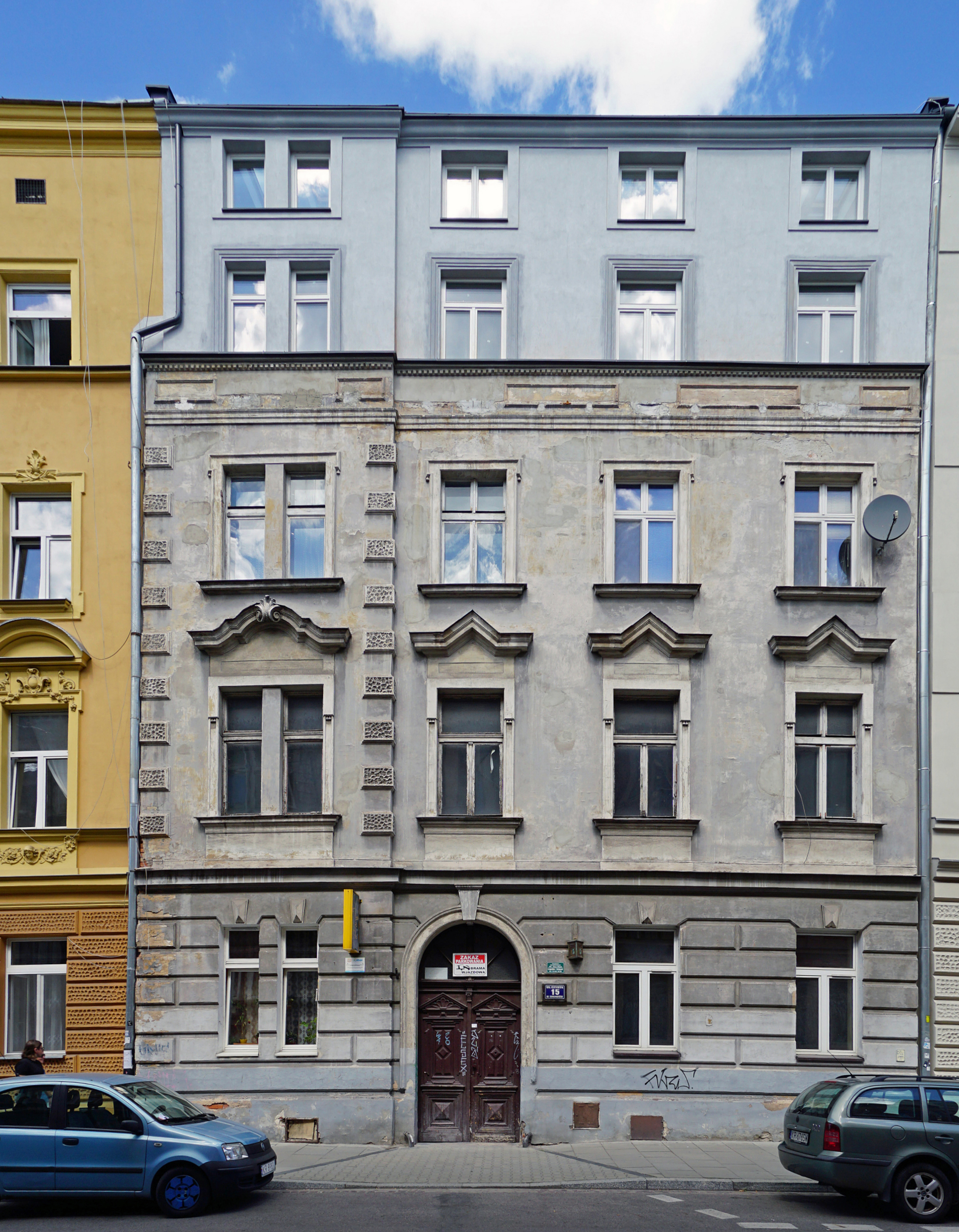
8 Czysta Street
Tenement house (design. Leopold Tlachna, 1899)

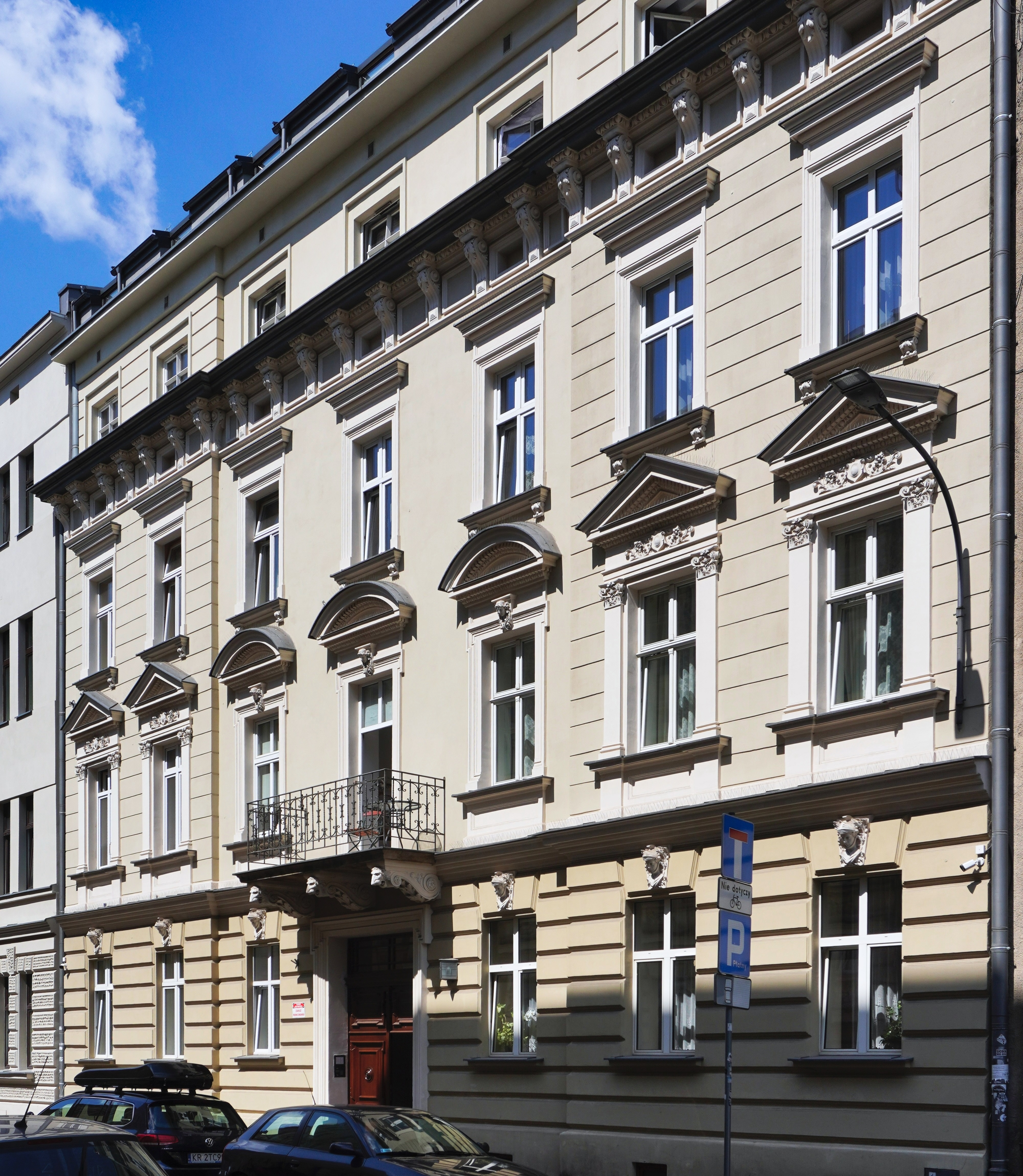
11 Czysta Street
Tenement house (design. Karol Janecki and J. Mroczek, 1893)

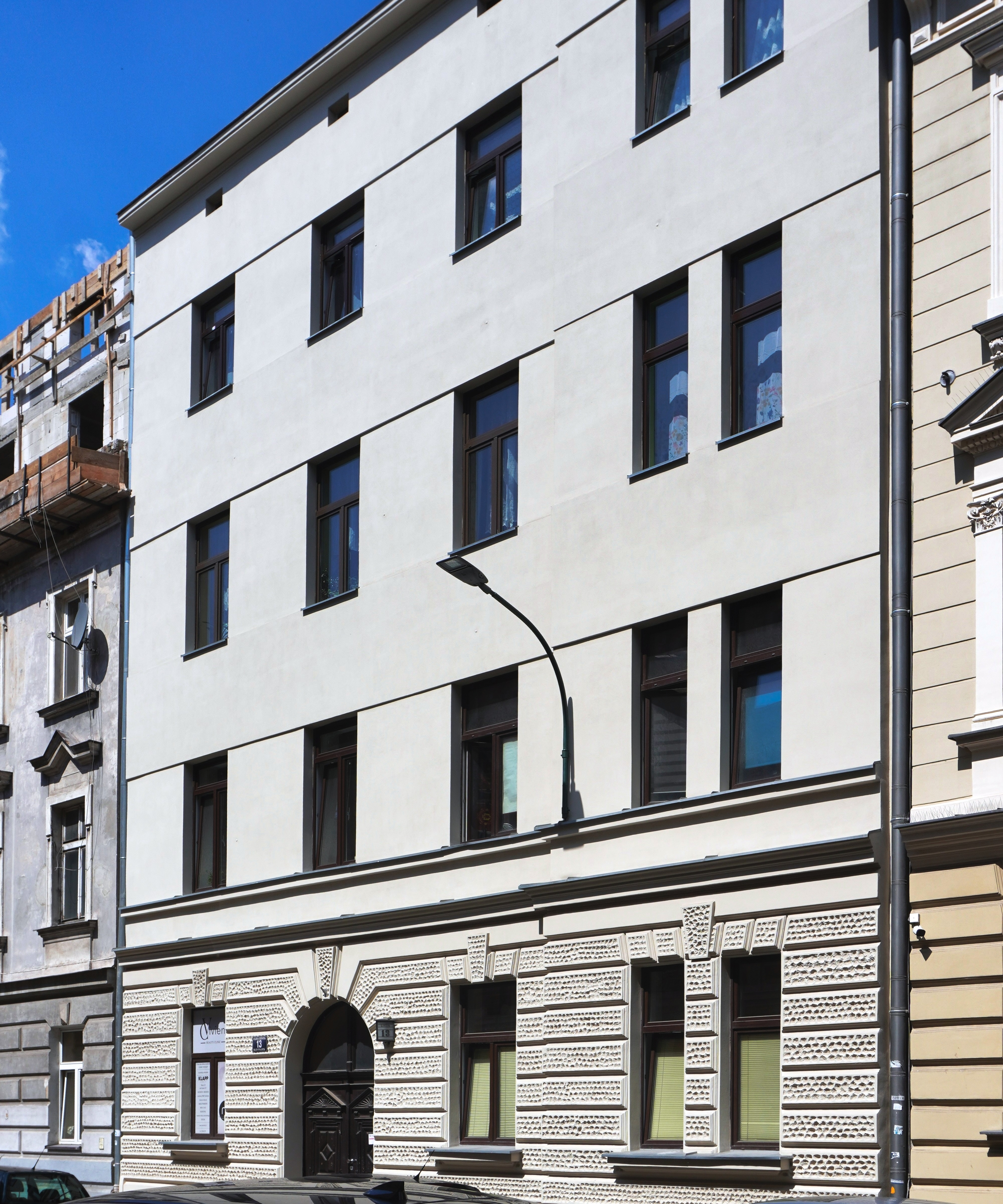
13 Czysta Street
Tenement house (1900)

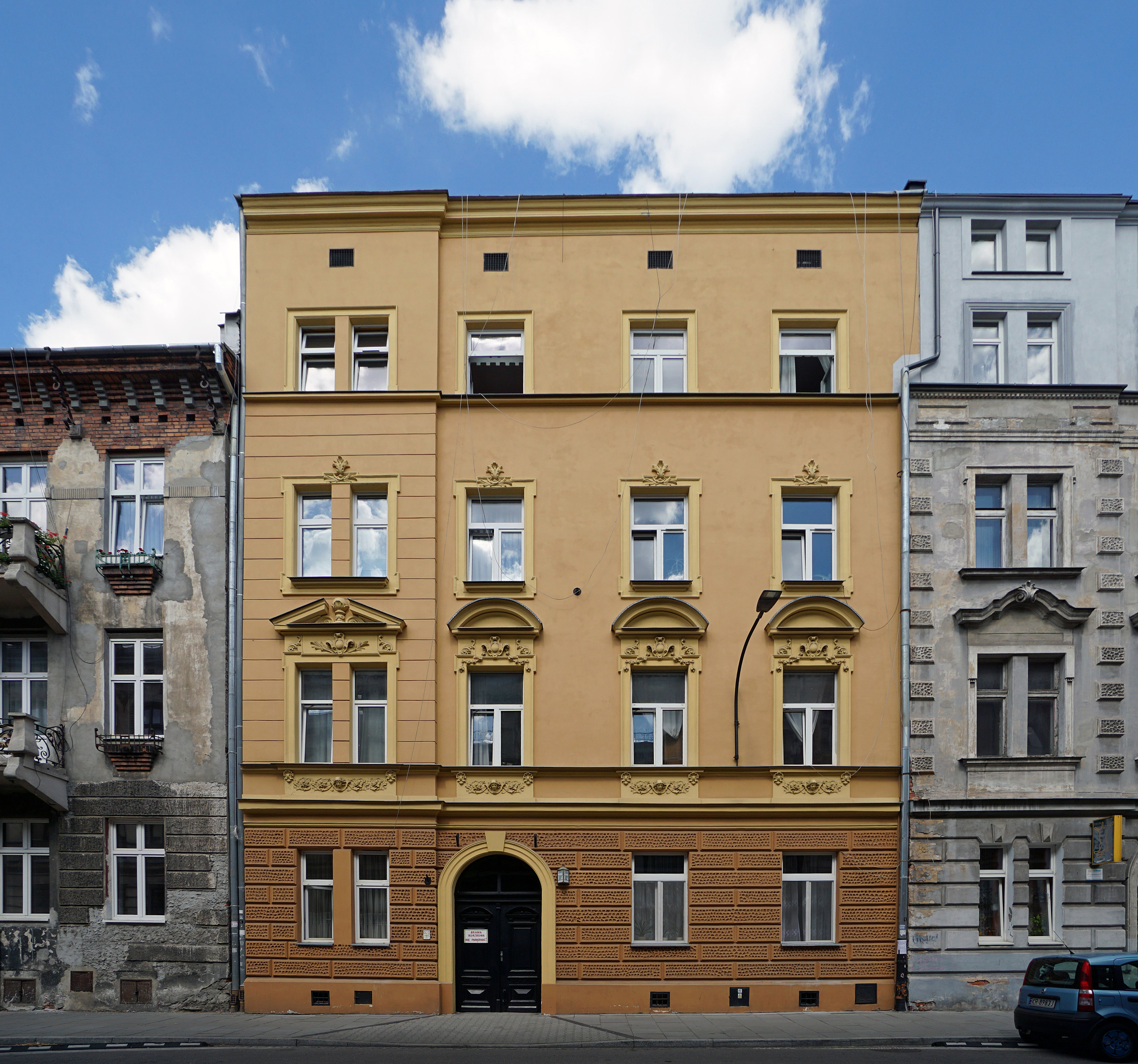
17 Czysta Street
Tenement house (design. Leopold Tlachna, 1892)

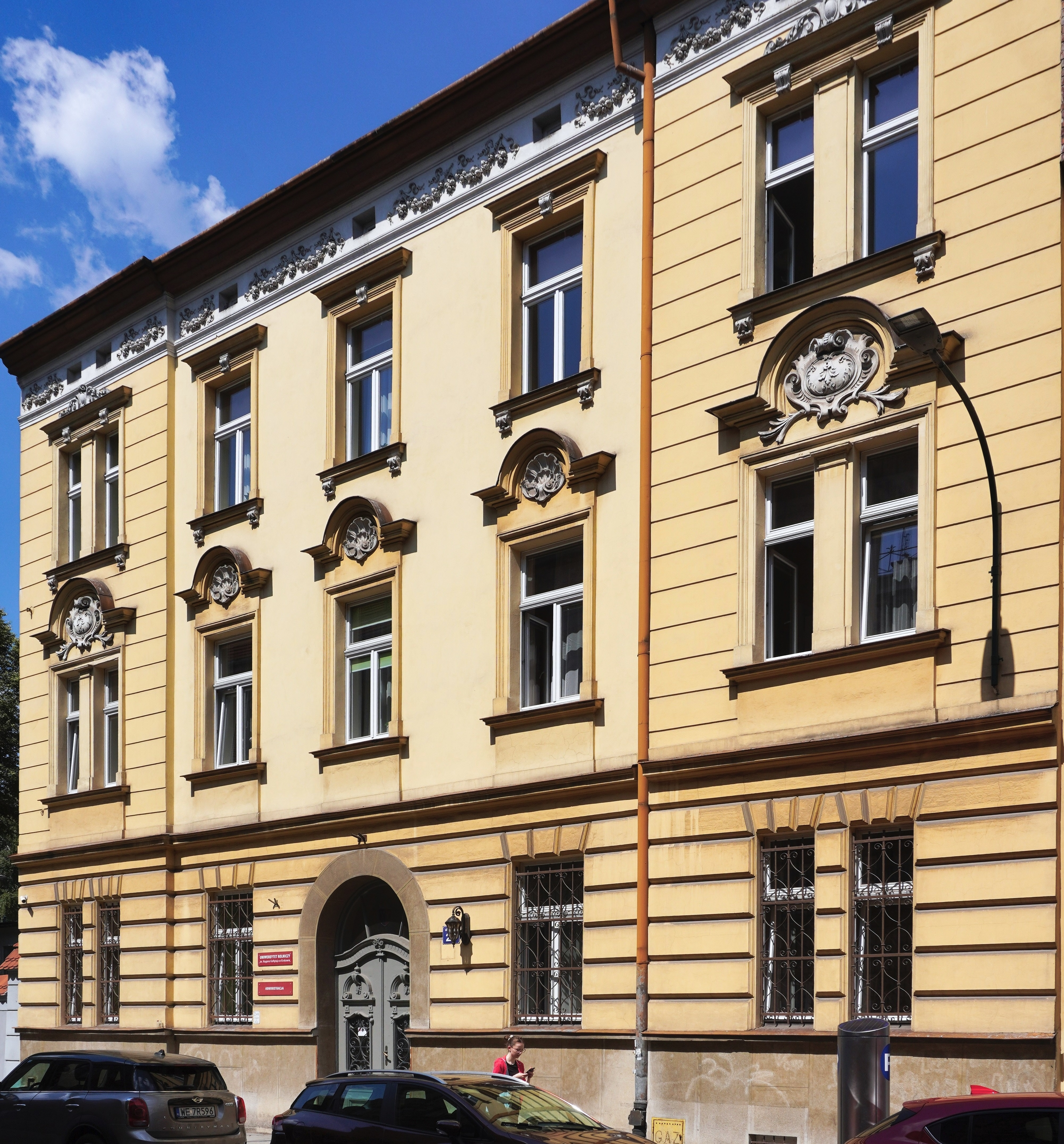
21 Czysta Street
Tenement house (design. Leopold Tlachna, 1899)
