= Dolnych Młynów Street =

Street in Kraków, Poland

Dolnych Młynów street
Kraków
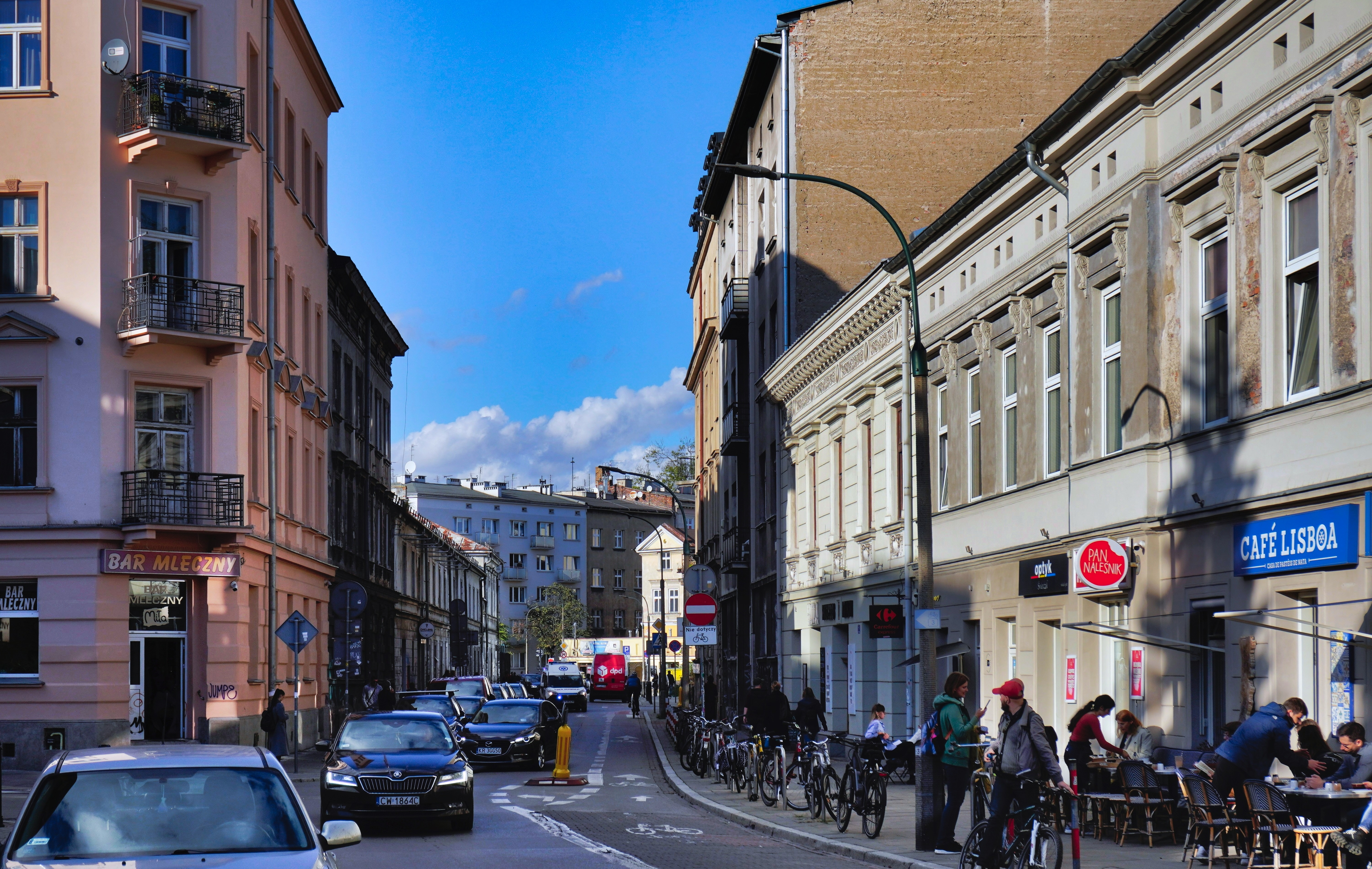
- View north from the intersection with Krupnicza Street
- Interactive map of Dolnych Młynów street
- Part of: Kraków Old Town
- Owner: City of Kraków
- Location: Kraków, Poland

Dolnych Młynów Street in Kraków is a street in Kraków, in District I Old Town, in Piasek.

It connects Czarnowiejska Street and Piotr Michałowski Street with Krupnicza Street. It is a single-carriageway road.

== History ==
The street was initially named Dolna Street, a name associated with its topography. This name first appeared on the city map in 1807 (in the German form Thal Gasse). In 1858, the Kraków City Council gave the street its current name.

In July 1850, a fire broke out on the street (considered one of the most tragic events in the city in the 19th century), which destroyed many tenement houses in the Old Town. After the fire, the street was regulated, and its course was straightened.

== Buildings ==
- Dolnych Młynów (27 Krupnicza Street) – Former seat of the Tax Office. Designed by Wacław Krzyżanowski, 1921–1926.
- 3 Dolnych Młynów Street – Residential house, 1808.
- 4 Dolnych Młynów Street (1 Czysta Street) – Historic tenement in the Neo-Baroque style. Designed by Stefan Ertel, 1893.
- 5 Dolnych Młynów Street – Residential house, 1853.
- 6 Dolnych Młynów Street – Tenement house, 1892.
- 7 Dolnych Młynów Street – Tenement house. Designed by Julian Grabowski, 1922.
- 8–10 Dolnych Młynów Street (Czarnowiejska Street) – Former tobacco and cigar factory, 1872.
- 9 Dolnych Młynów Street (24 Rajska Street) – Tenement house. Designed by Jacek Matusiński, 1876.
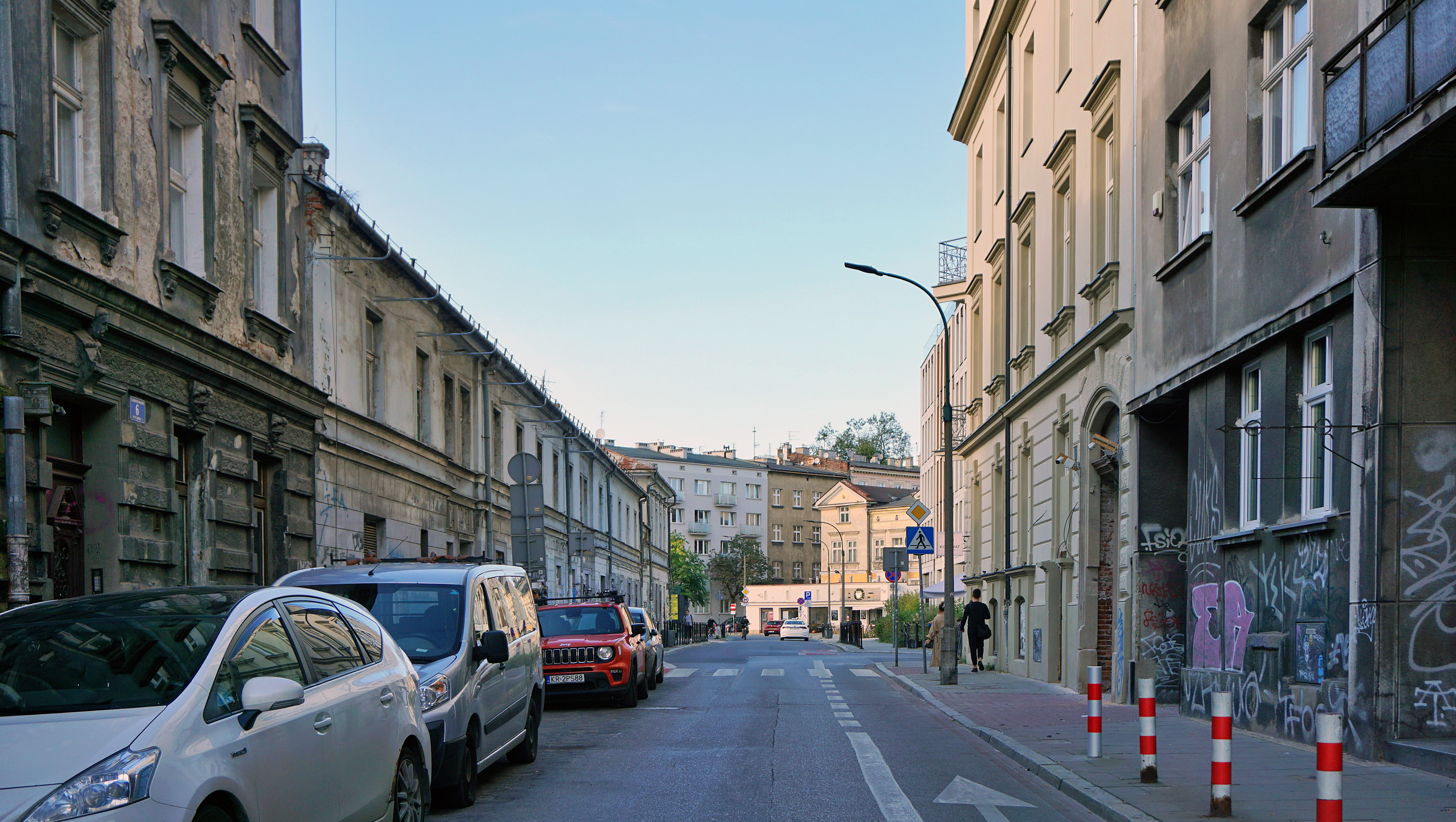
View to the north, at the intersection with Czysta Street

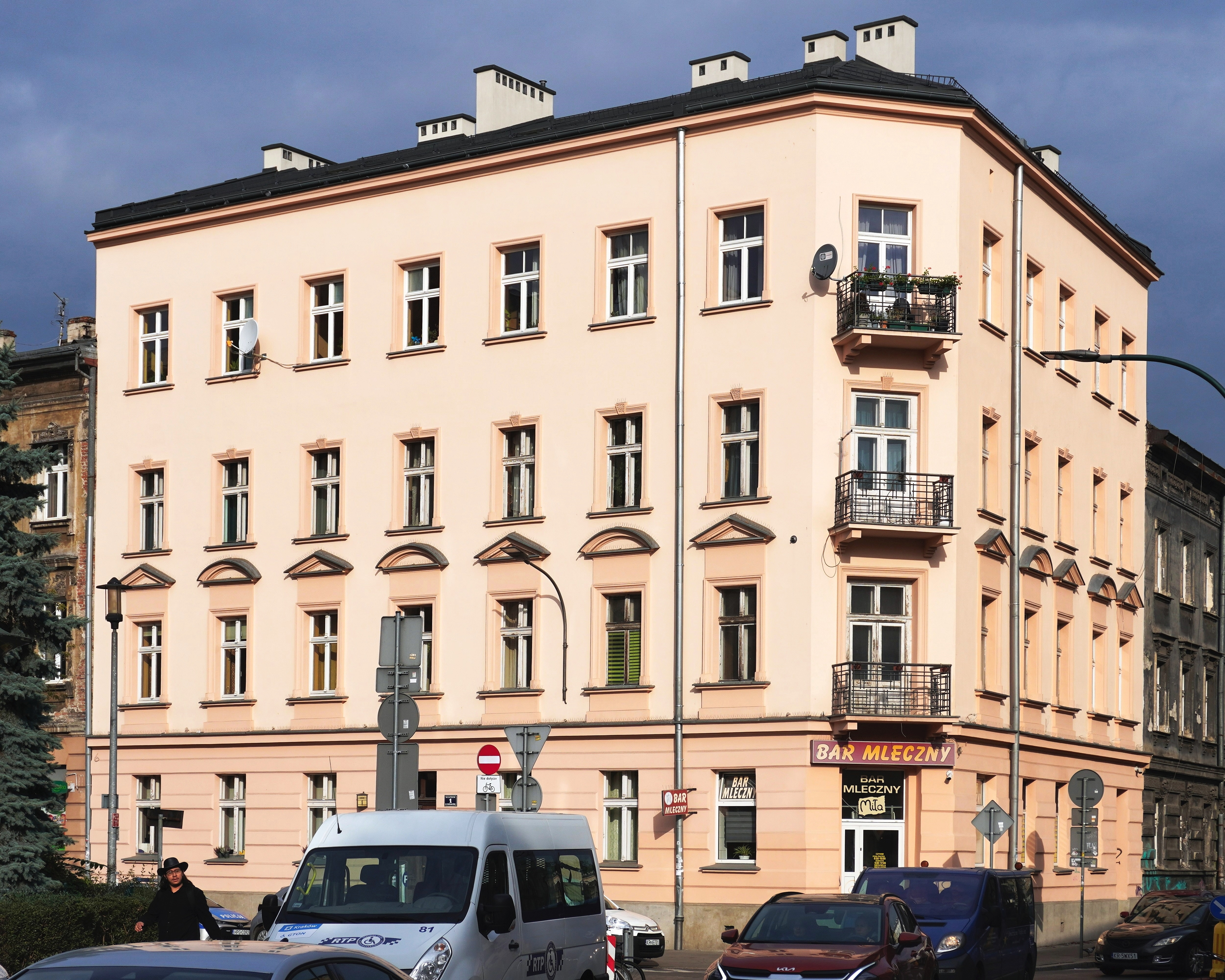
4 Dolnych Młynów Street (1 Czysta Street)
Tenement house (design. Stefan Ertel, 1893)

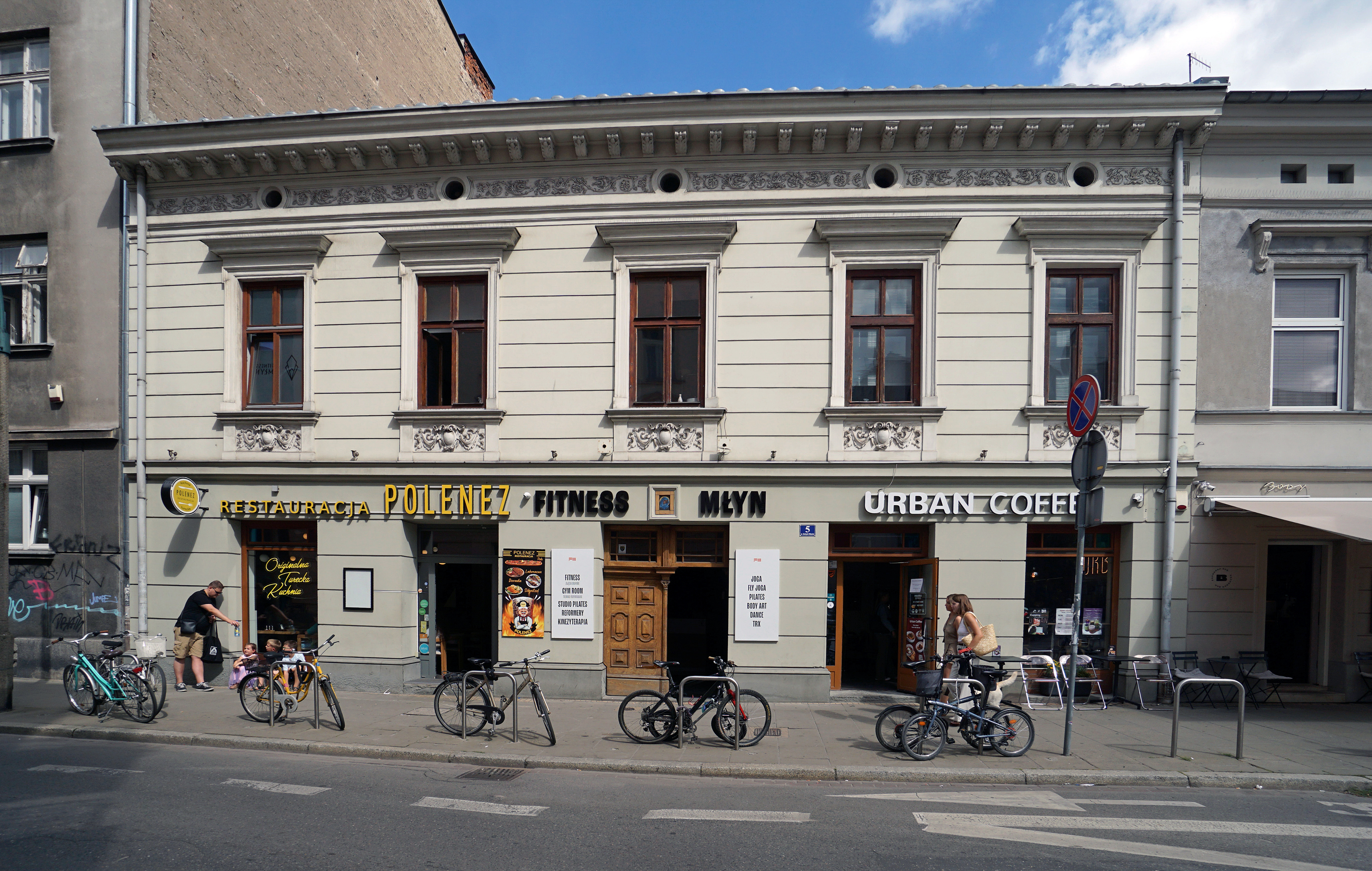
5 Dolnych Młynów Street
Tenement house (1853)

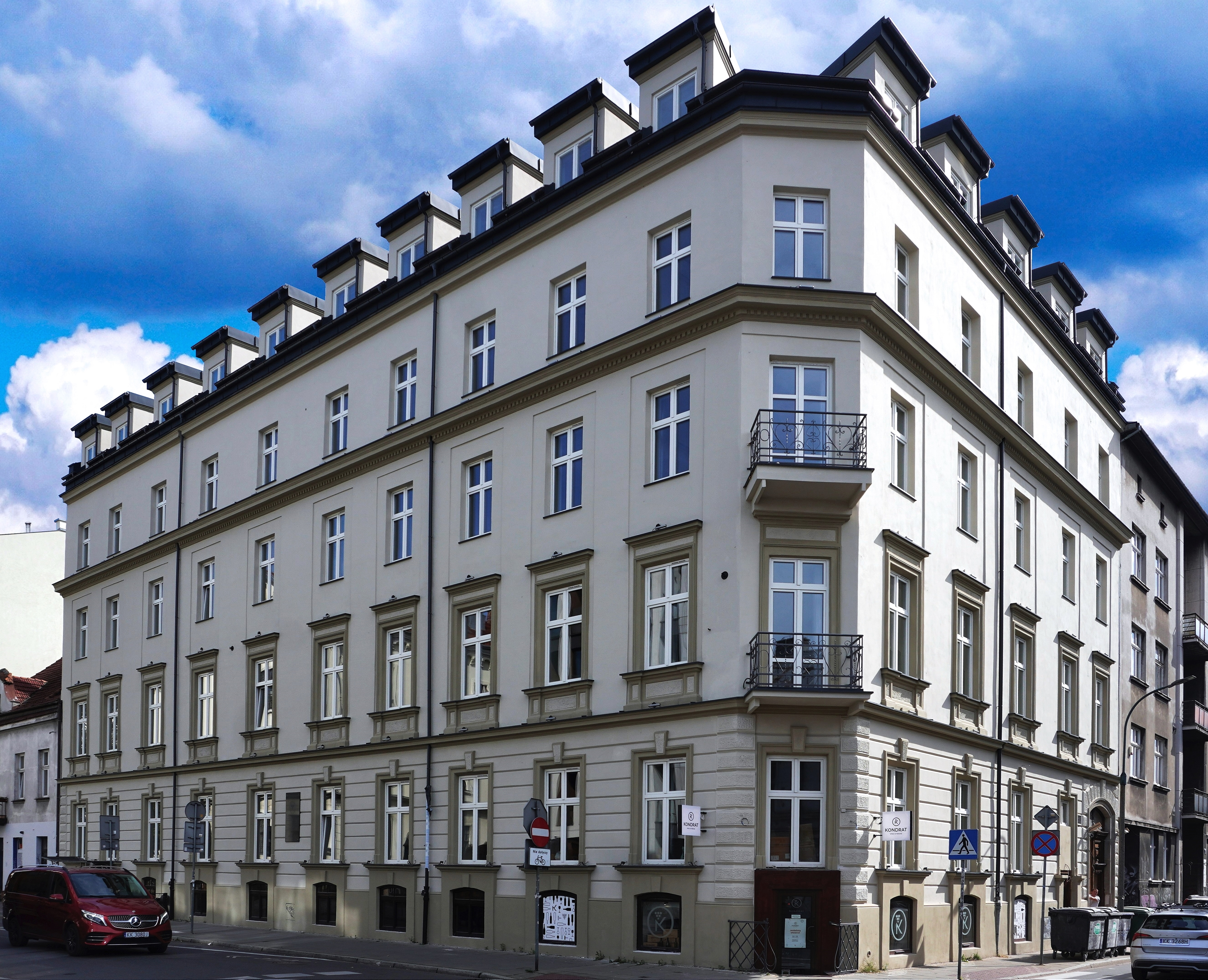
9 Dolnych Młynów Street (24 Rajska Street)
Tenement house (design. Jacek Matusiński, 1876)
