= Rajska Street =

Historic street in Kraków, Poland

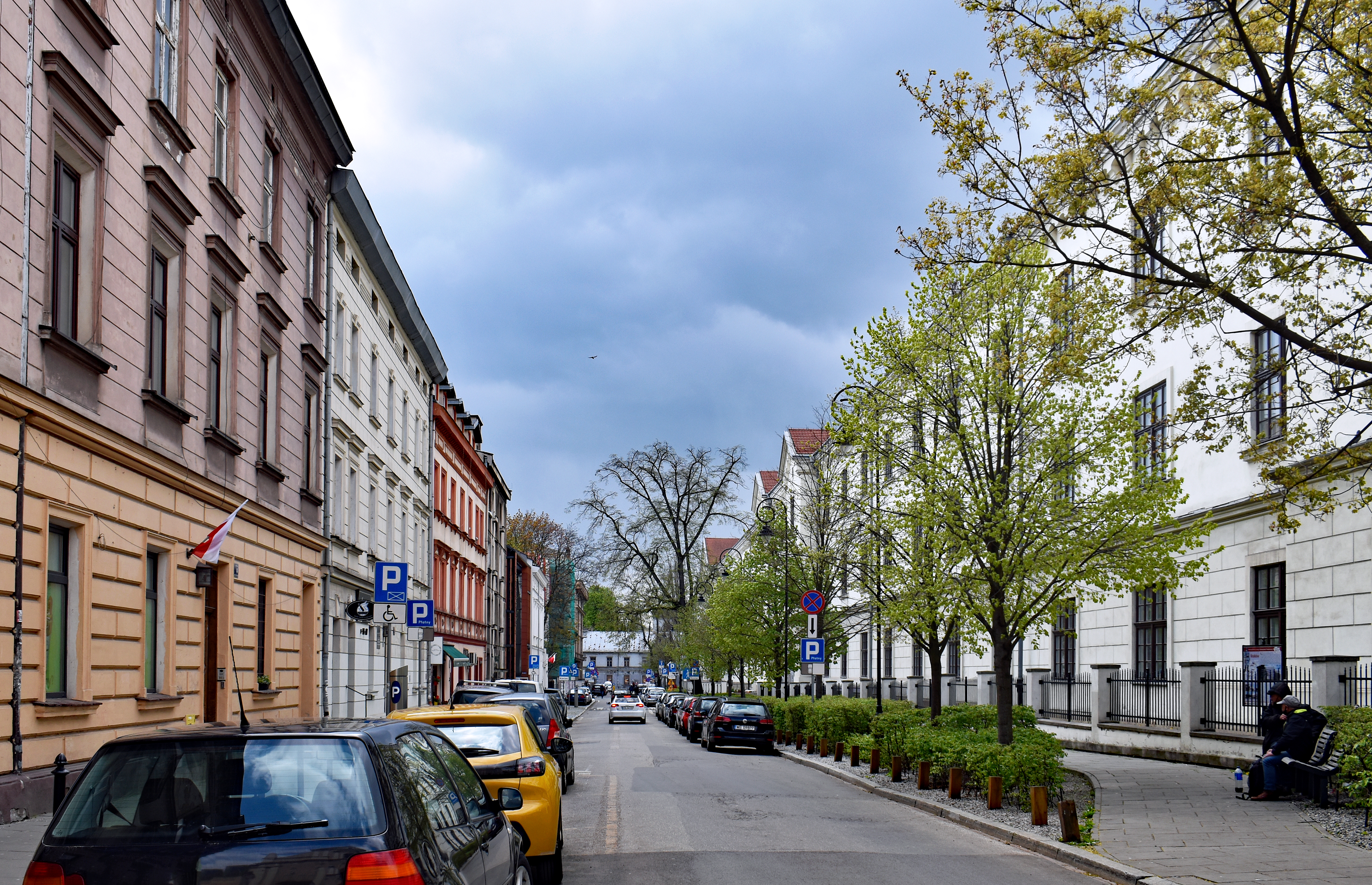
- View from the Karmelicka Street to the west
- Interactive map of Rajska Street
- Part of: Stare Miasto district
- Owner: City of Kraków
- Location: Kraków; Poland
- Coordinates: 50°03′53.2″N 19°55′46.4″E

Historic Monument of Poland
- Designated: 1994-09-08
- Part of: Kraków historical city complex
- Reference no.: M.P. 1994 nr 50 poz. 418

Rajska Street (Polish: Ulica Rajska, lit. Paradise Street) - a historic street in Piasek, the former district of Kraków, Poland.

It connects Karmelicka Street with Dolnych Młynów Street.

== History ==
It was laid out in the 16th century within the jurisdiction of Garbary. Its current shape took form following the construction of Austrian barracks around 1860. The barracks building, designed by Feliks Księżarski, occupies the northern frontage and has housed the Provincial Public Library since 1992. The southern frontage consists of multi-family buildings from the early 20th century and the interwar period. Initially, the street had no name; in the first half of the 19th century, it was called Dolna Street, and its current name was given around 1850.

In May 2010, at 12 Rajska Street, on the site of a former horse riding arena that, along with its adjacent areas, served as the decoration workshop for the Słowacki Theatre and briefly housed the Municipal Popular Theatre in Krakow, construction began on the Małopolska Garden of Arts, a center for the arts in Krakow. The official opening of the facility took place on October 19, 2012.

== Buildings ==
- 1 Rajska Street – Provincial Public Library, 1858 design. Feliks Księżarski
- 5 Rajska Street – Tenement house, 1875.
- 6 Rajska Street – Tenement house, designed by August Cybulski, 1886.
- 8 Rajska Street – Tenement house, designed by Józef Ochmański, 1877.
- 12 Rajska Street – Małopolska Garden of Art (Małopolski Ogród Sztuki)
- 20 Rajska Street – Tenement house, designed by Jozue Oberleder, 1911.
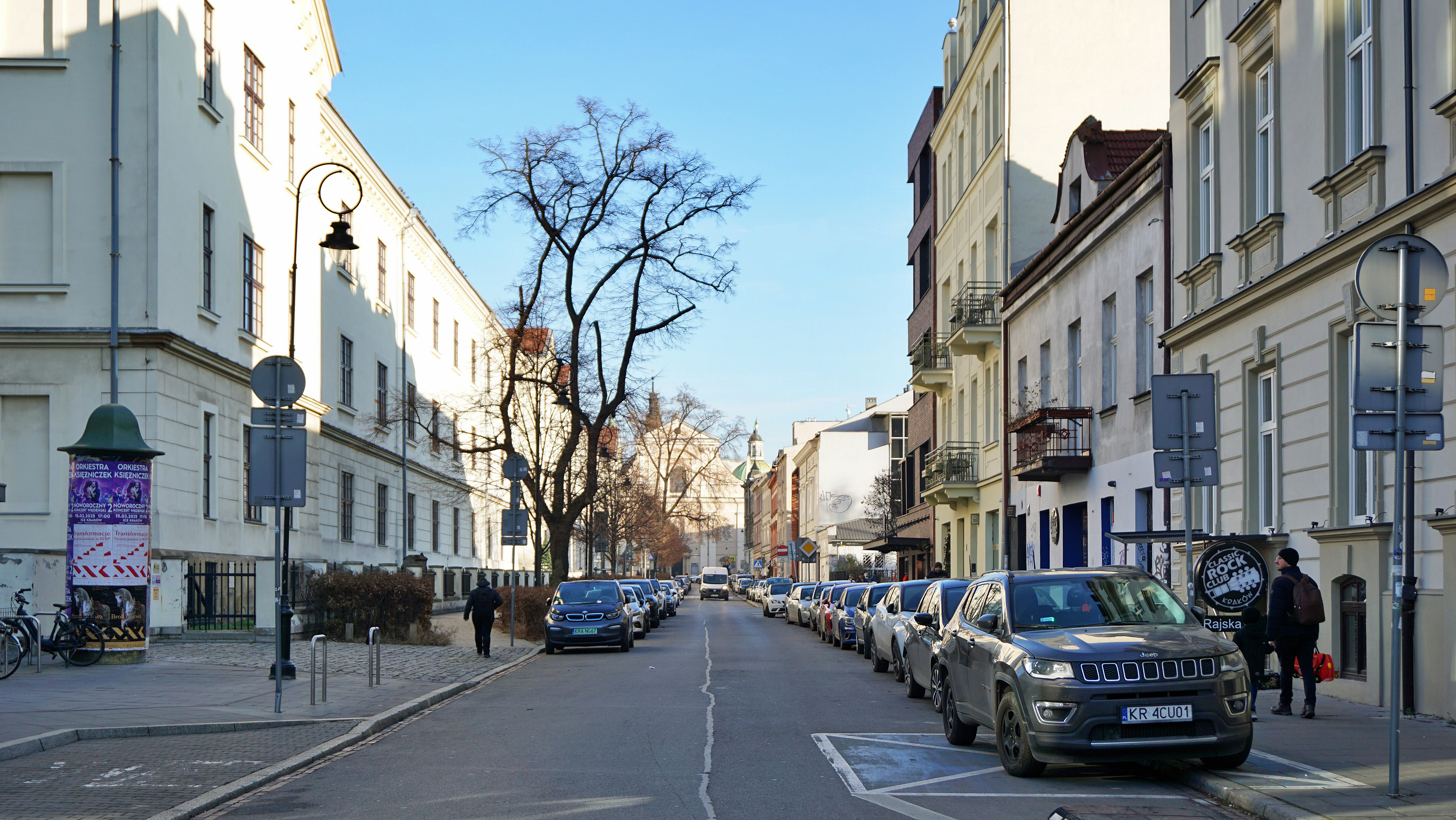
View from the intersection with Dolnych Młynów Street

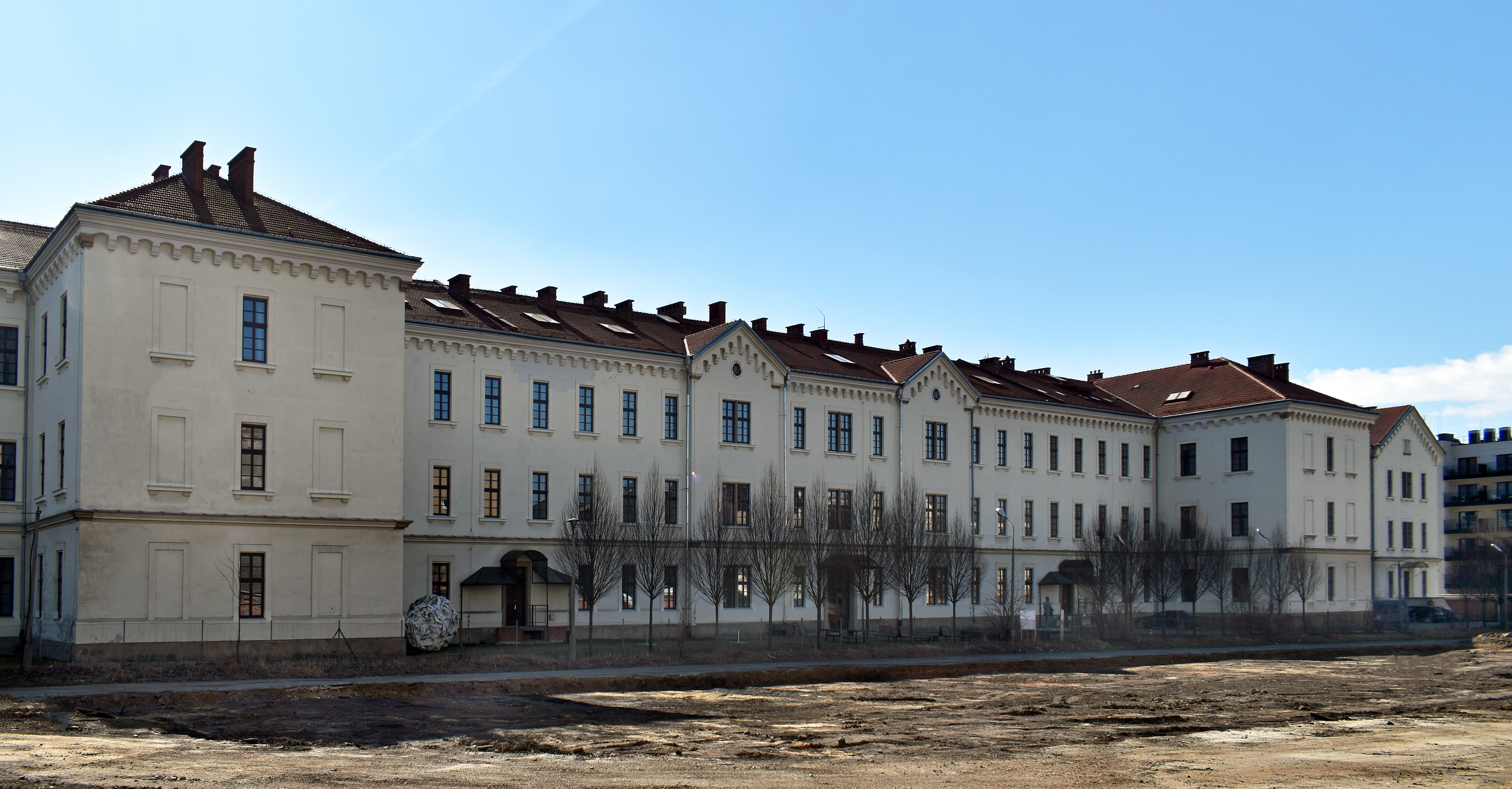
1 Rajska Street
Provincial Public Library
(former Austro-Hungarian Army military barracks)

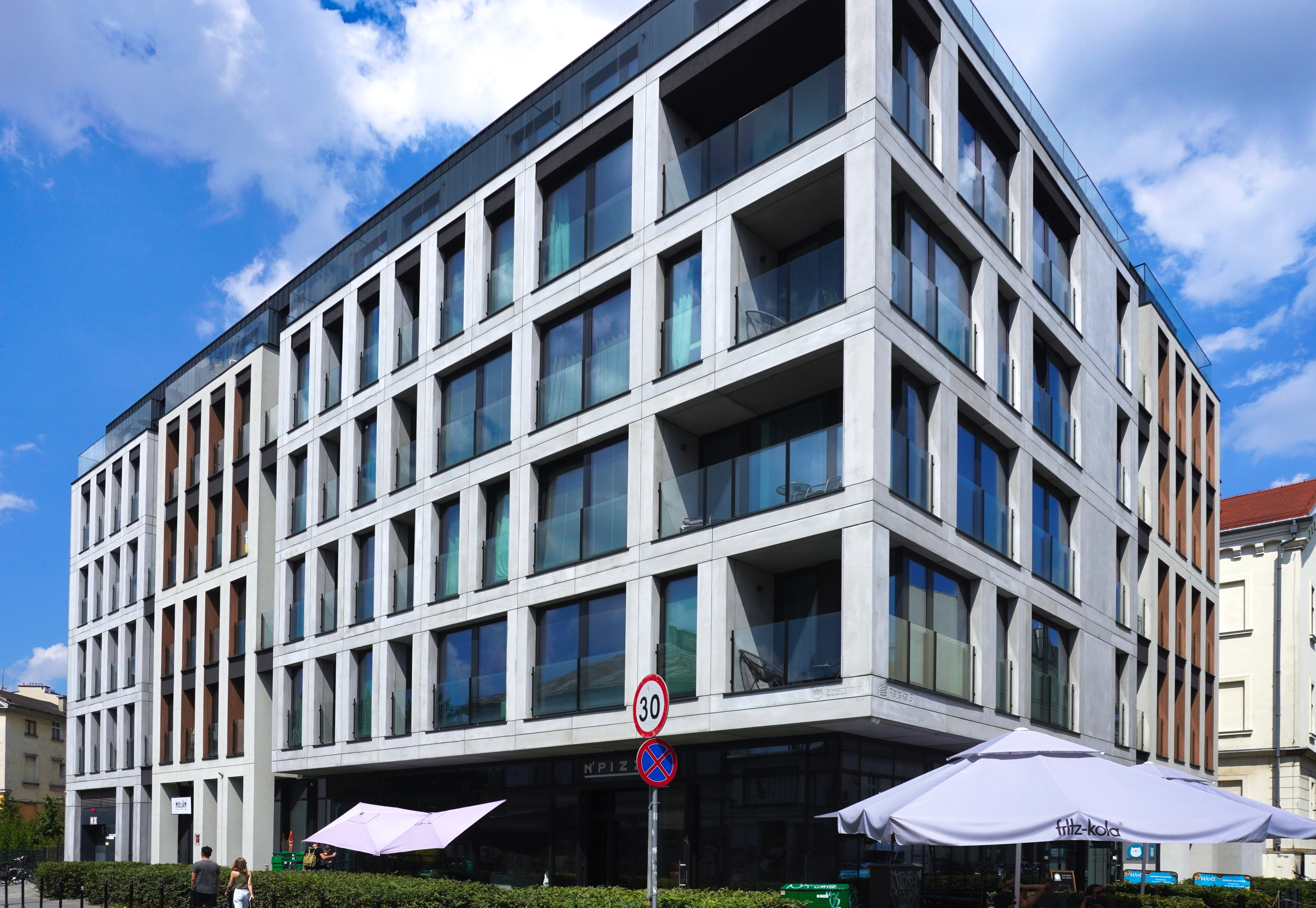
3 Rajska Street
Residential building (2017–2019)

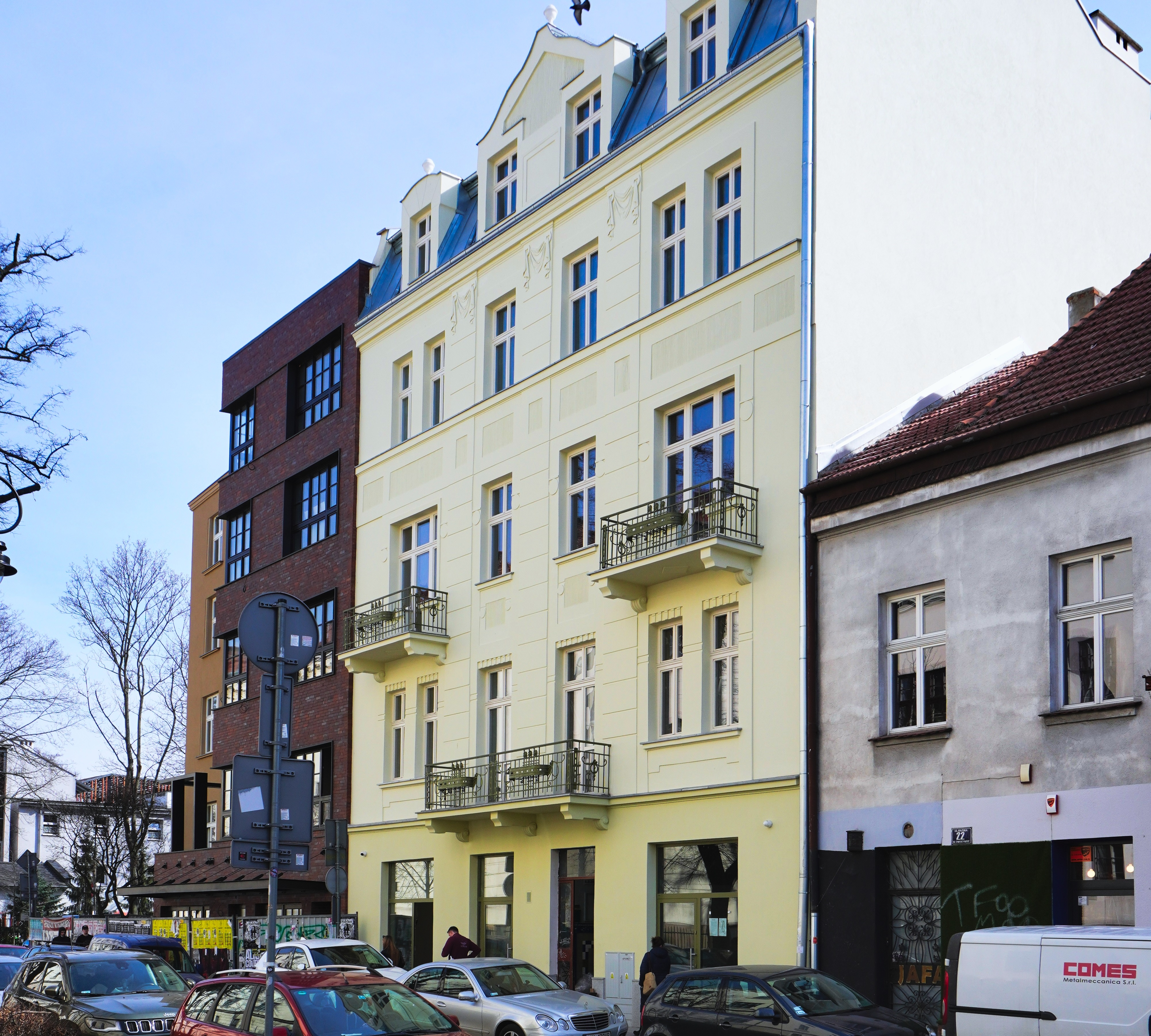
20 Rajska Street
Tenement house (design. Jozue Oberleder, 1911–1912)

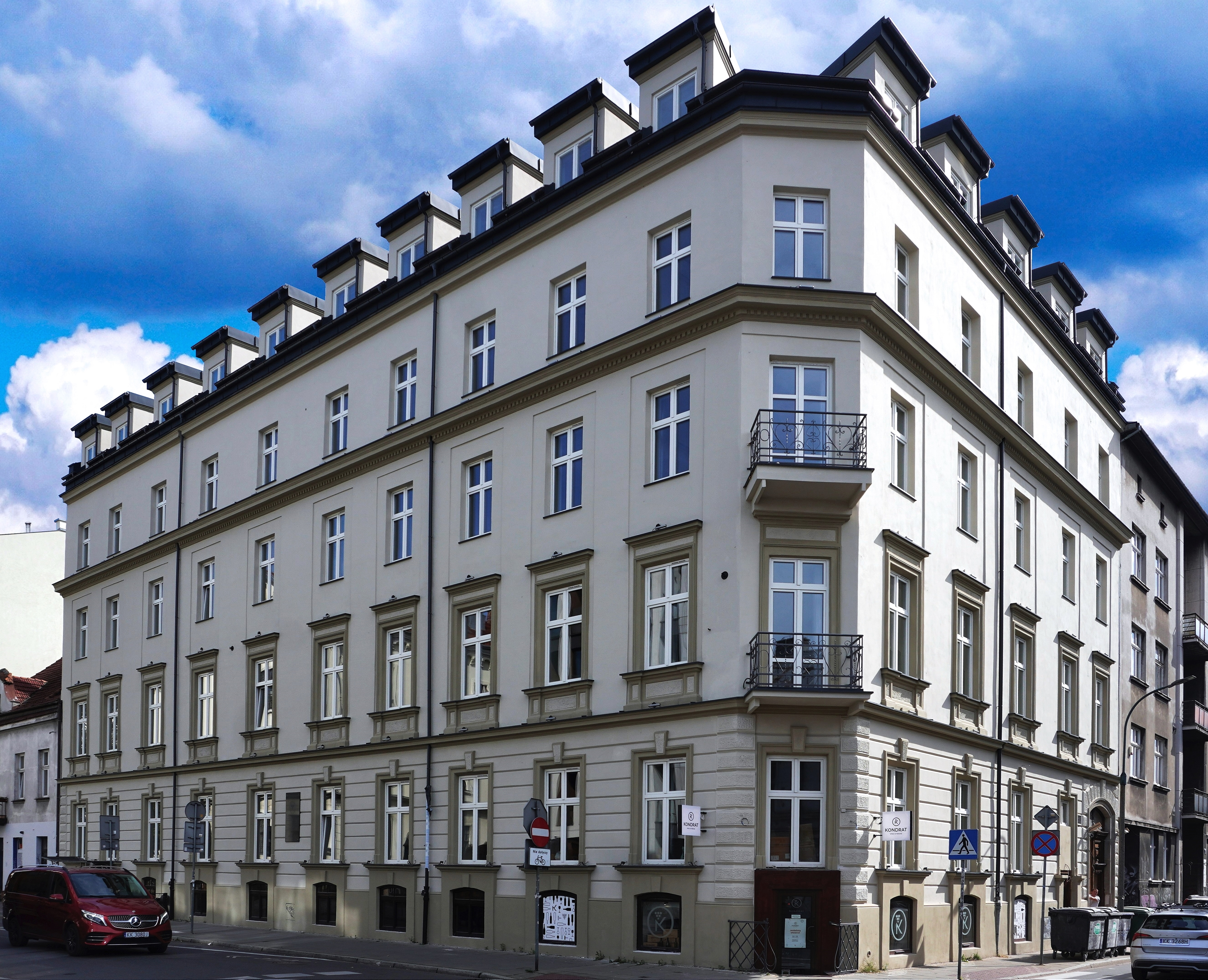
ul. Rajska 24 (9 Dolnych Młynów Street)
Tenement house (design. Jacek Matusiński, 1876)
