= Baroque in Poland =

Polish artistic style

The Polish Baroque lasted from the early 17th to the mid-18th century. As with Baroque style elsewhere in Europe, Poland's Baroque emphasized the richness and triumphant power of contemporary art forms. In contrast to the previous, Renaissance style which sought to depict the beauty and harmony of nature, Baroque artists strove to create their own vision of the world. The result was manifold, regarded by some critics as grand and dramatic, but sometimes also chaotic and disharmonious and tinged with affectation and religious exaltation, thus reflecting the turbulent times of the 17th-century Europe.

== Sarmatism ==
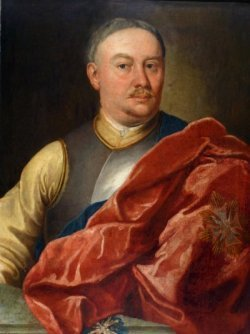
Portrait of Jakub Narzymski by Szymon Czechowicz, 1738

The Polish Baroque was influenced by Sarmatism, the culture of the Polish nobility (szlachta). It developed after the Swedish Deluge. Sarmatism became highly influenced by the Baroque style and produced a unique mix of Oriental (Ottoman) and Western (French, Italian) styles. Those Oriental influences stemmed from a large border shared by Poland with the Ottoman Empire, and the frequent skirmishes between the two countries.

A Sarmatist thought had praised the idyllic countryside-existence, and the liberal Golden Liberty of the nobility, which stood against the absolute power of the monarchy. Sarmatism stressed the military prowess going back to the times when szlachta first emerged from the knight class; and its religious values, both associated with the historical mission of the Polish people as a bastion of Catholic Christianity. Sarmatian nobles felt superior to even the nobility of the other nations, whom they considered non-free and almost enslaved by their rulers (according to Poland's constitution, the king was but the "first among equals"). With the progression of time, however, the Sarmatism ideals became corrupted. By the time of the 18th-century Enlightenment in Poland, Sarmatism was often regarded as a backward and ultraconservative relic of the past.

On a more material realm, Oriental influences were visible in nobles' attire, arms, and decorations. New Polish costume was based on the Ottoman Empire's robe, which spread from nobility to city dwellers and even peasants. A Polish nobleman wore long robe-like garment such as żupan, delia, and kontusz, often lined with expensive cloth; fitted with a sash belt (pas kontuszowy) and accessorized with knee-high boots from soft leather. Arabian horses were common in Polish cavalry. During the 17th century shaving one's head in the Tatar fashion became popular. The symbol of the noble class was the curved blade weapon, the szabla, a cross between sabre and scimitar. Ottoman daggers, sheaths, carpets, helmets, saddles, klims, rugs, tapestries and embroideries were also common: what was not acquired from trade came as loot from many military conflicts along the Commonwealth southern border. The manor (dwór, dworek) of the Polish nobleman was decorated with such war trophies. Some luxury items were of domestic produce, often imitating the Orient style; most were imported from the West via Danzig (Gdańsk) or from the East. Displaying one's wealth was important, and excuses were many: the name day of the patron saint as well as weddings and funerals were observed in extravagant fashion. A distinctive art of coffin portraits emerged during that period.

== Counter-reformation ==
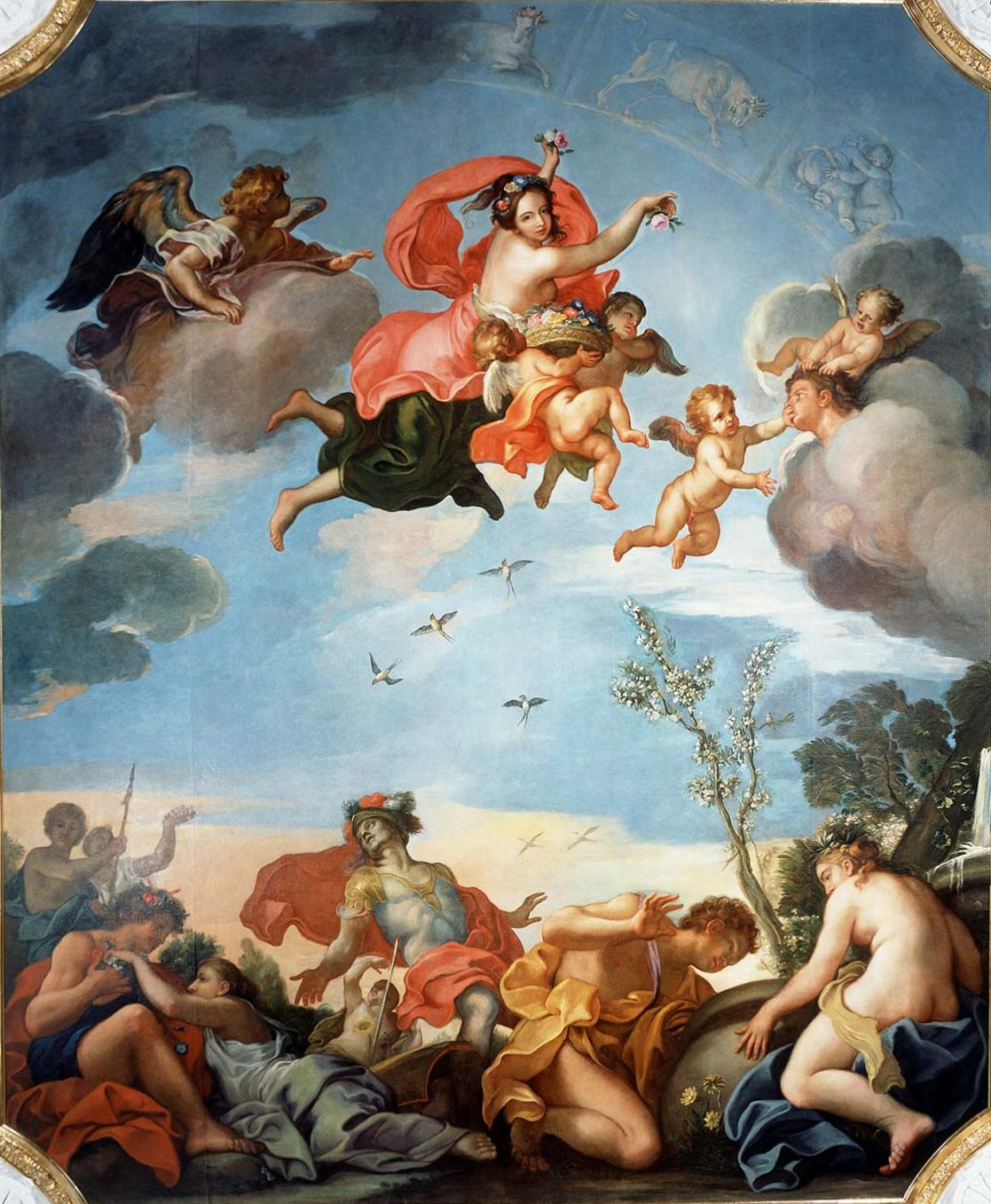
Plafond Allegory of Spring by Jerzy Siemiginowski-Eleuter, 1680s

The Roman Catholic Church became one of the major patrons of the arts; another was the royal house, whose patronage was most visible in the new capital of Warsaw. There the pious Catholic King Sigismund III Vasa sponsored many Baroque sacral constructions. In its first phase, ecclesiastical Baroque architecture was primarily associated with the Jesuit Order, who arrived in Poland in 1564, as part of the Counter-Reformation, a trend which over the next century would triumph in Poland. The Jesuits established churches and schools in many major cities, slowly winning over the Protestant educational centers in Thorn (Toruń), Danzig and Elbing (Elbląg), and Leszno (where the Comenius school of the Bohemian Brothers was located). The eventual victory of the counter-reformation in Poland would eventually revive and buttress the Catholic identity of Poland.

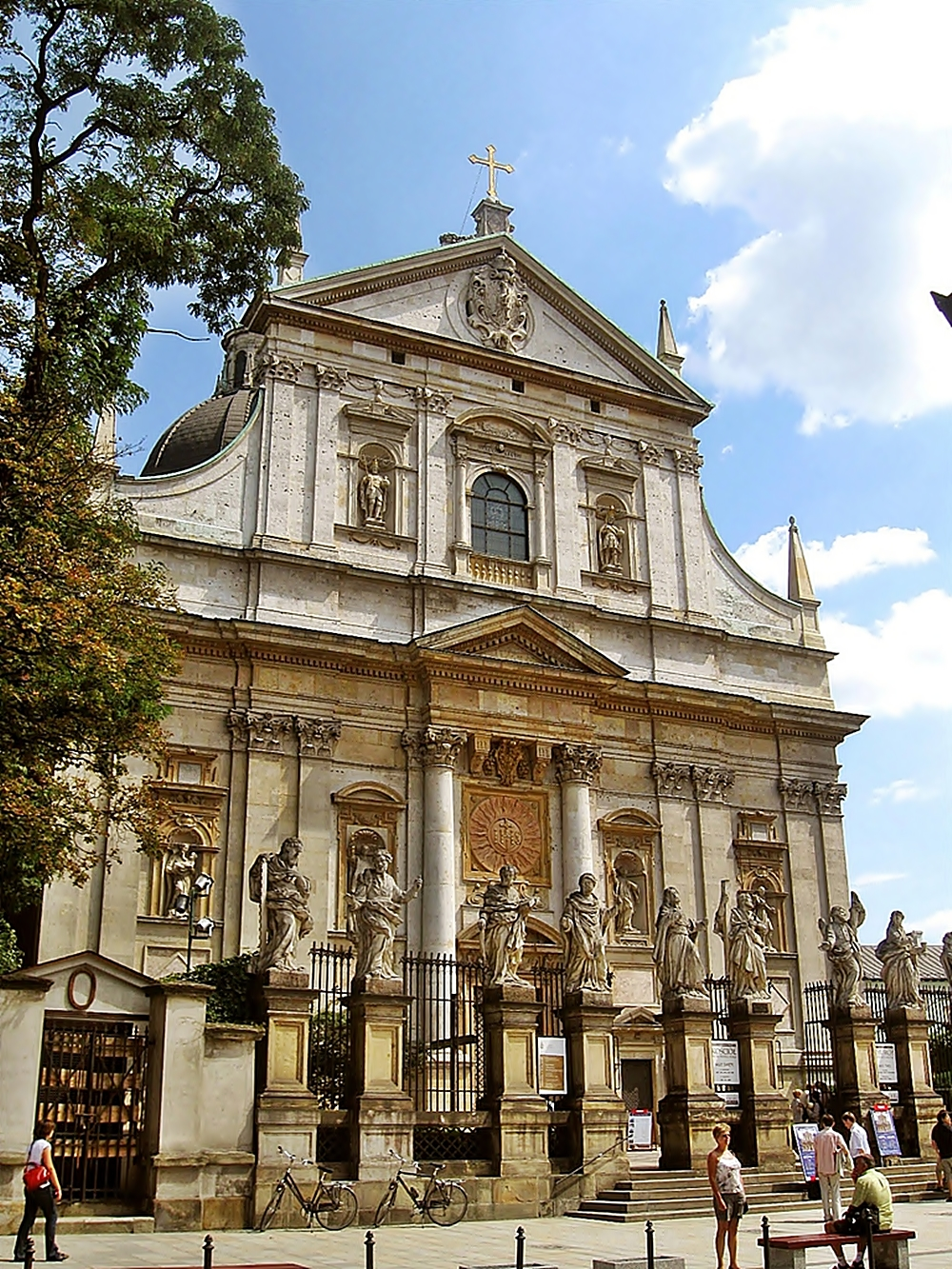
Saints Peter and Paul Church, Kraków, Poland

The monumental castle Krzyżtopór (permanent ruin), built in the style palazzo in fortezza between 1627 and 1644, had several courtyards surrounded by fortifications. Also, Late baroque fascination with the culture and art of China is reflected in Queen Marie Casimire d'Arquien's Chinese Palace in Zolochiv. 18th-century magnate palaces represents the characteristic type of baroque suburban residence built entre cour et jardin (between the entrance court and the garden). Its architecture, a merger of European art with old Commonwealth building traditions, is visible in Potocki Palace in Radzyń Podlaski, Raczyński Palace in Rogalin and Wiśniowiecki Palace in Vyshnivets.

During the late 17th century, the most famous architect in the Commonwealth was the Dutch-born Tylman van Gameren, who, at the age of 28, settled in the Crown of the Kingdom of Poland and worked for Queen Marie Casimire and King John III Sobieski. Tylman left behind a lifelong legacy of buildings that are regarded as gems of Polish Baroque architecture, they include among others, the Ostrogski Palace, Otwock Palace, Branicki Palace, St. Casimir Church and the Church of St. Anne.

== Architecture ==
The first Baroque structure in the Polish–Lithuanian Commonwealth was the Corpus Christi Church built between 1586 and 1593 in Nyasvizh (after 1945 in Belarus). The church also holds a distinction of being the first domed basilica with a Baroque façade in the Commonwealth and Eastern Europe.

In the subsequent years of the early 17th century, Baroque architecture spread over the Commonwealth. Important Baroque churches built during this early phase of the style included the Saints Apostles Peter and Paul Church, Kraków, the Vasa Chapel in the Wawel Cathedral (which was the Baroque equivalent to a neighboring Sigismund's Chapel built years earlier in the Renaissance style), and the Church of the Visitation of the Blessed Virgin Mary, Kraków. Most of these early Baroque churches followed a design pattern set by Giacomo Barozzi da Vignola's Church of the Gesù in Rome. Other important Baroque churches and chapels erected in the mid-17th century were the Dominican Church and St. George's Church in Lwów (present day Lviv, Ukraine). Examples from the late 17th-century include the Jesuit Church in Poznań, St. Francis Xavier Cathedral, Grodno, Royal Chapel in Gdańsk (which incorporates an eclectic architectural style based on a mix of Polish and Dutch building traditions), and Sanctuary of St. Mary in Masuria (built in the Tyrolean Baroque style). Notable examples of residential Baroque architecture from this time period include the Ujazdów Castle, Wilanów Palace and Krasiński Palace in Warsaw.

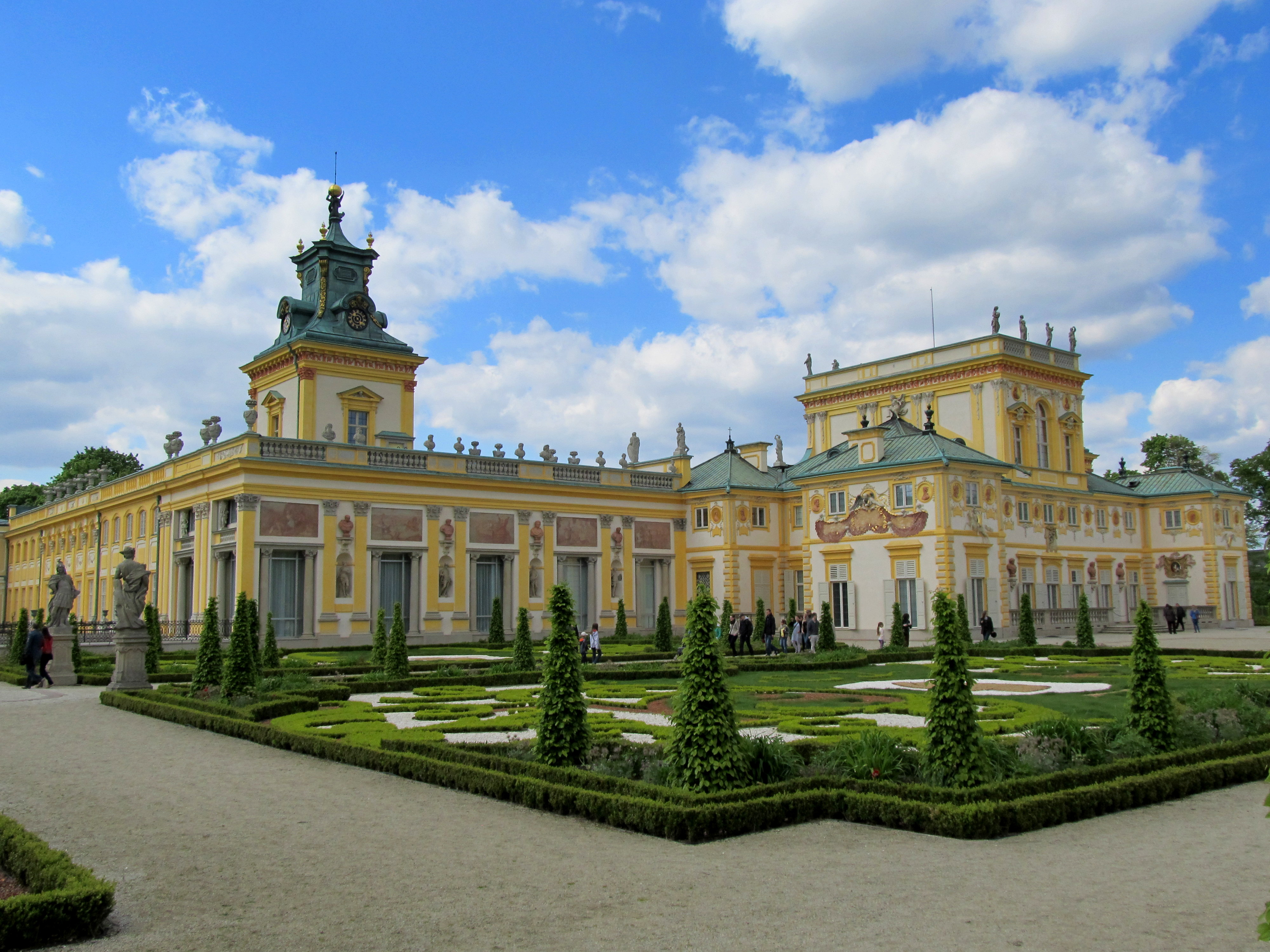
Wilanów Palace in Warsaw, the 17th- and 18th-century summer residence of Polish kings

Early Polish baroque buildings were often designed by foreign (most often, Italian) architects. The first baroque building in present-day Poland was the Saints Apostles Peter and Paul Church, Kraków by Giovanni Battista Trevano. The Jewish population in this period was large and prosperous, and many handsome Polish Jewish synagogues were built in baroque style. A handful of these buildings survive, including the one at Włodawa.

Secular Baroque architecture also grew. The Royal Castle, Warsaw was reconstructed between 1596 and 1619 by the Italian architects Giacomo Rotondo, Matteo Castelli and Jan Trevano. Outside the Castle, a column with the Statue of King Sigismund, sculpted by Clemente Molli and cast by Daniel Tym was raised by his son, Władysław IV Vasa, in 1644. Ujazdów Park with a new palace, the Ujazdów Castle, was built by Trevano between 1619 and 1625. Palace of Ujazdów was soon overshadowed by the Wilanów Palace, raised by King John III Sobieski between 1677 and 1696. Style of those new royal mansions was soon imitated by numerous magnates who did not want to fall behind the times, leading to numerous baroque residences springing throughout Polish countryside, such as at Kruszyna (1630, built for Voivode Kasper Doenhoff), Łańcut (1629–1641, rebuilt for Stanisław Lubomirski), Wiśnicz (1616–1621, also for Stanisław Lubomirski), Ujazd (Krzyżtopór built in 1628-1644 for Krzysztof Ossoliński).

== Heritage designation ==
Several Baroque buildings in Poland are protected as UNESCO World Heritage Sites, including those forming part of the historic centres of Warsaw, Kraków, Toruń and Zamość, and the Churches of Peace in Jawor and Świdnica.

Additionally, several more are designated Historic Monuments of Poland, including the Kielce Cathedral, Kozłówka Palace, Krzeszów Abbey, Łowicz Cathedral, Raczyński Palace in Rogalin, Święta Lipka Sanctuary, Basilica on the Holy Mountain in Głogówko and the St. Jadwiga's Basilica and Benedictine abbey in Legnickie Pole.

== Prominent examples ==
Churches

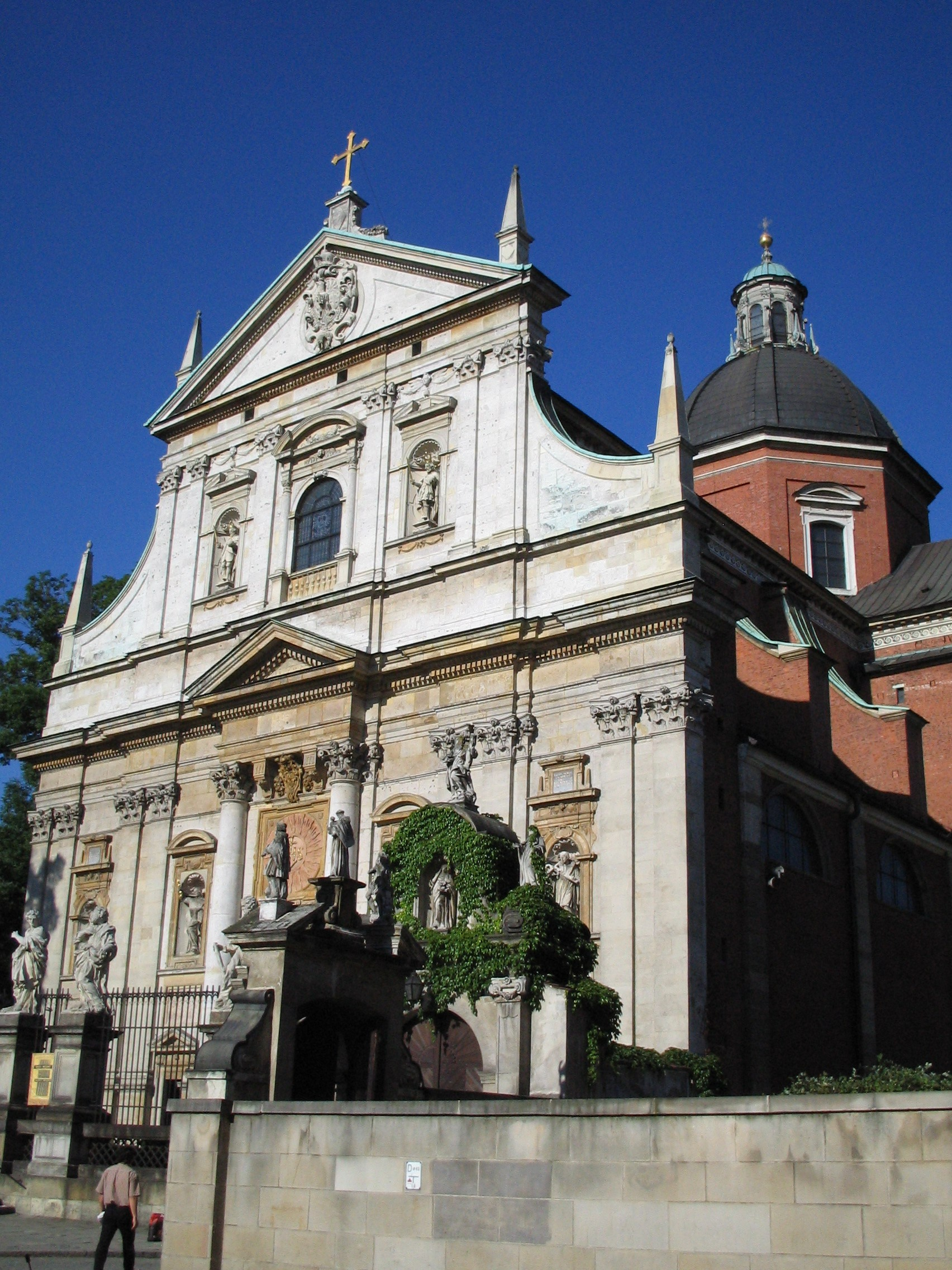
Saints Peter and Paul Church, Kraków

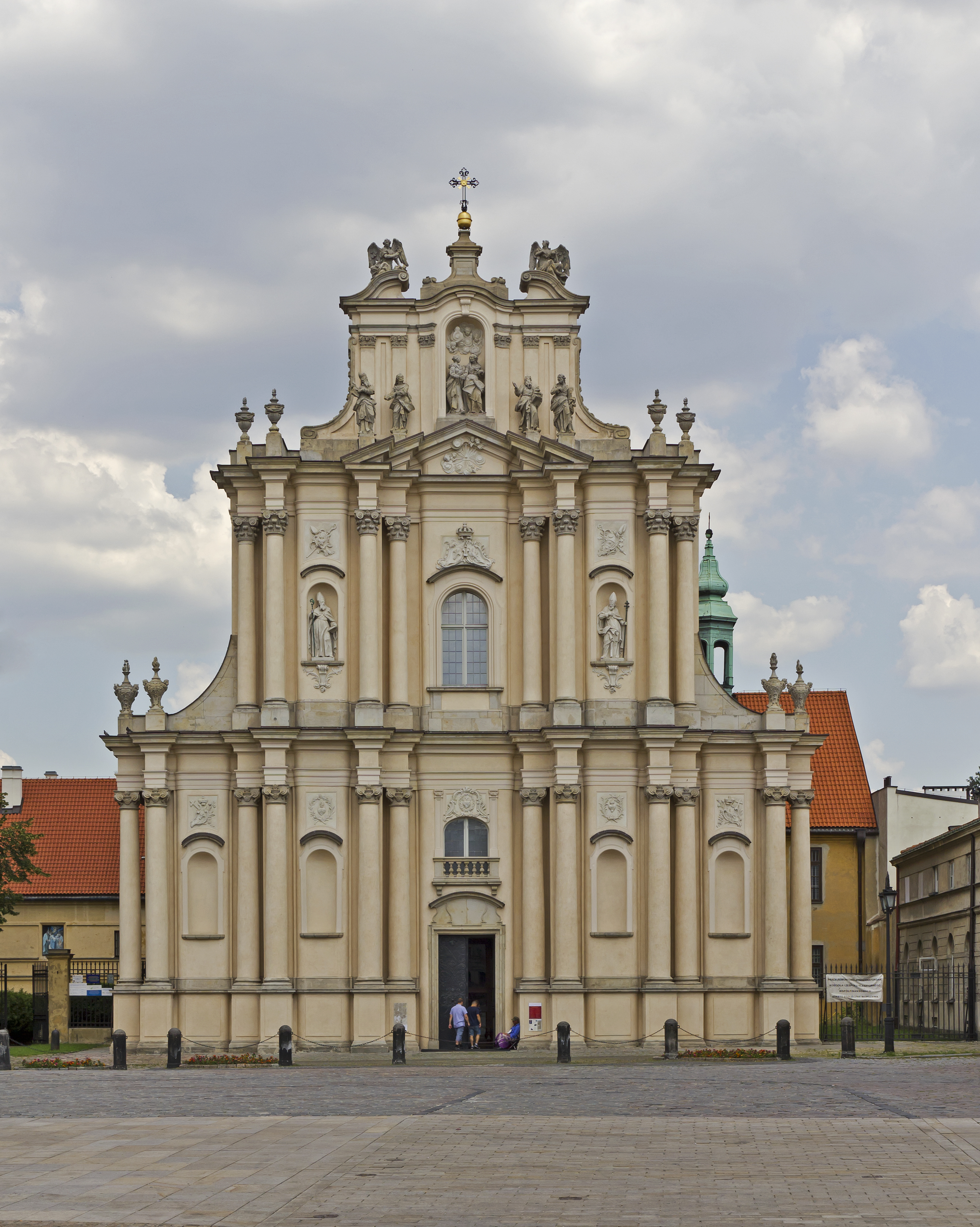
Visitationist Church in Warsaw

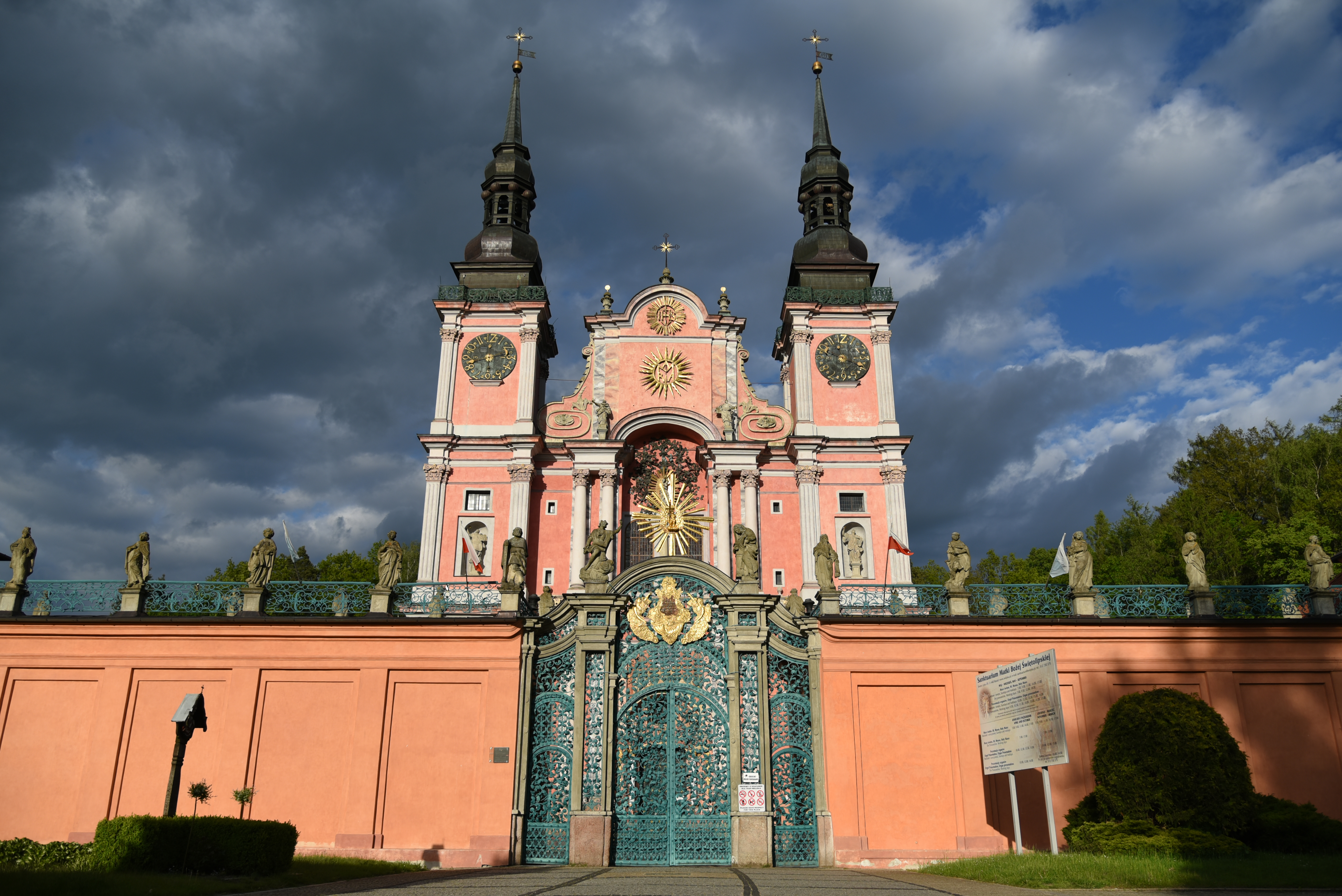
Basilica of the Blessed Virgin Mary, Święta Lipka

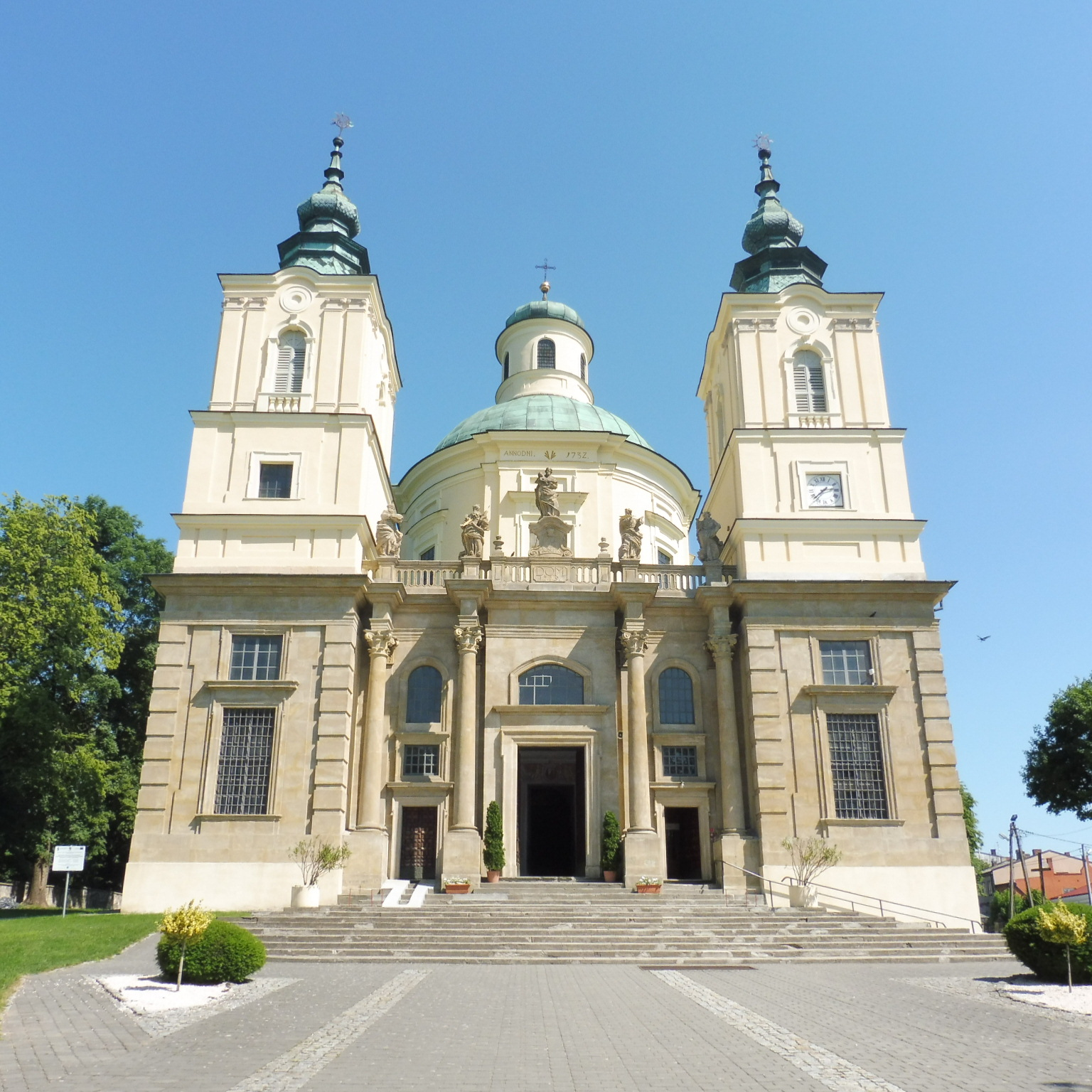
St. Joseph's Church, Klimontów

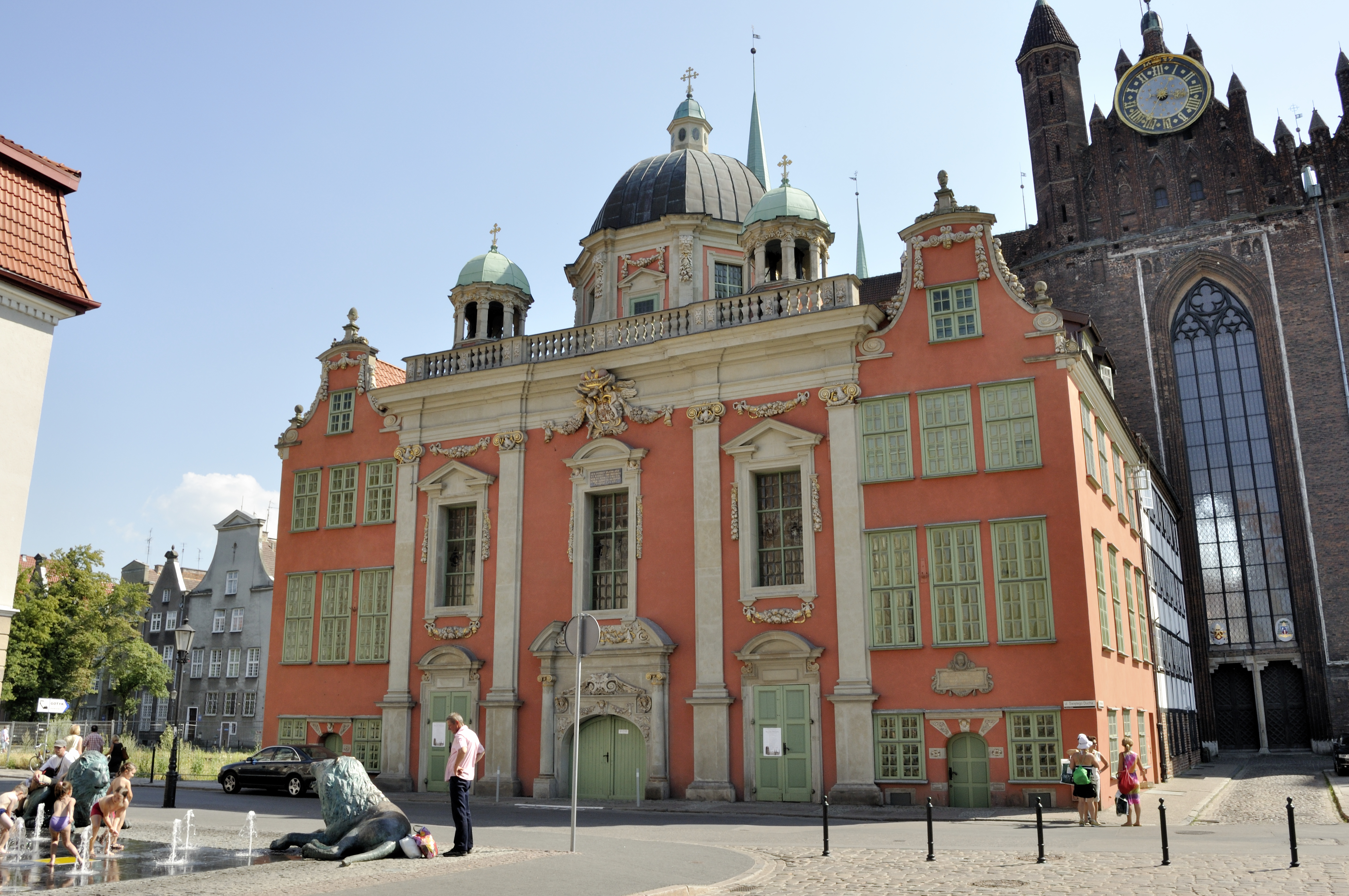
Royal Chapel by Tylman van Gameren, Gdańsk

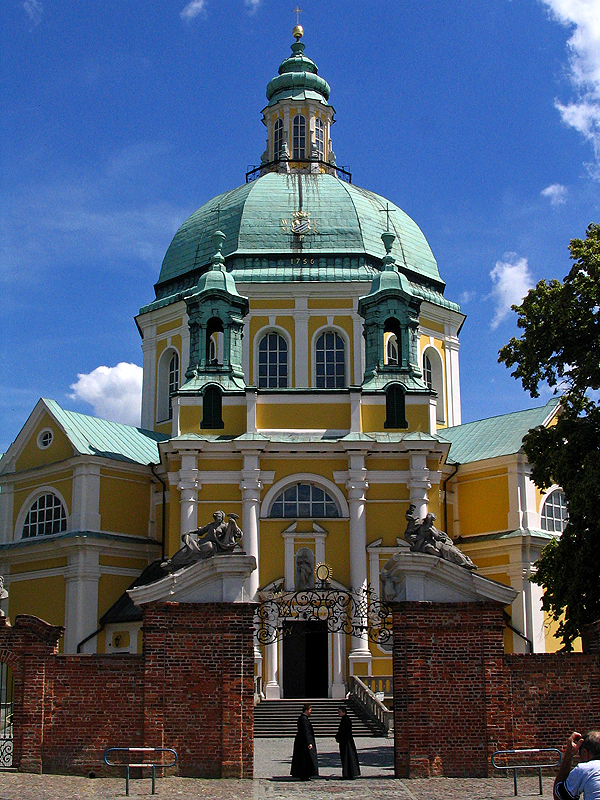
Basilica on the Holy Mountain, Głogówko

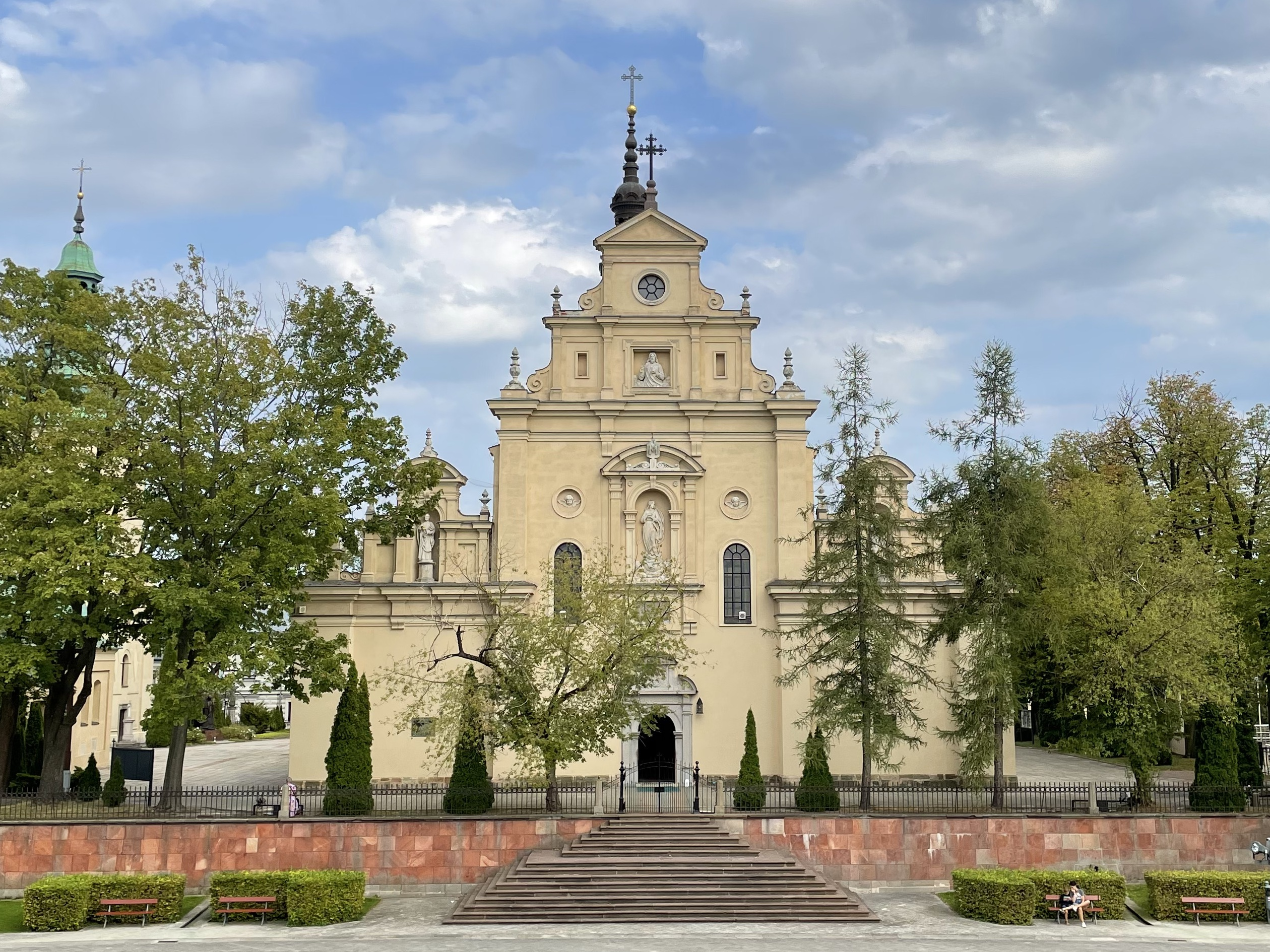
Cathedral Basilica of the Assumption, Kielce

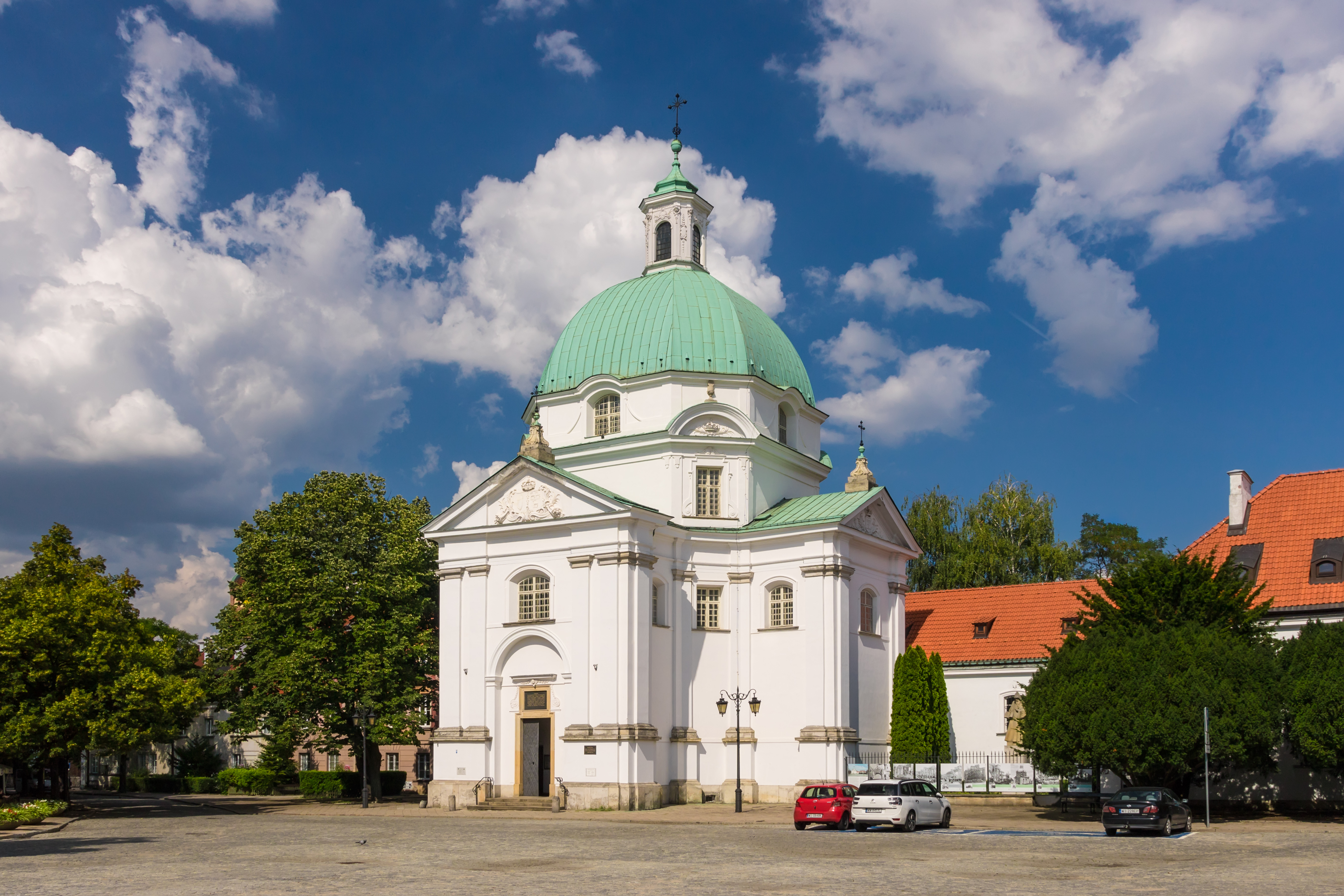
St. Casimir Church, Warsaw

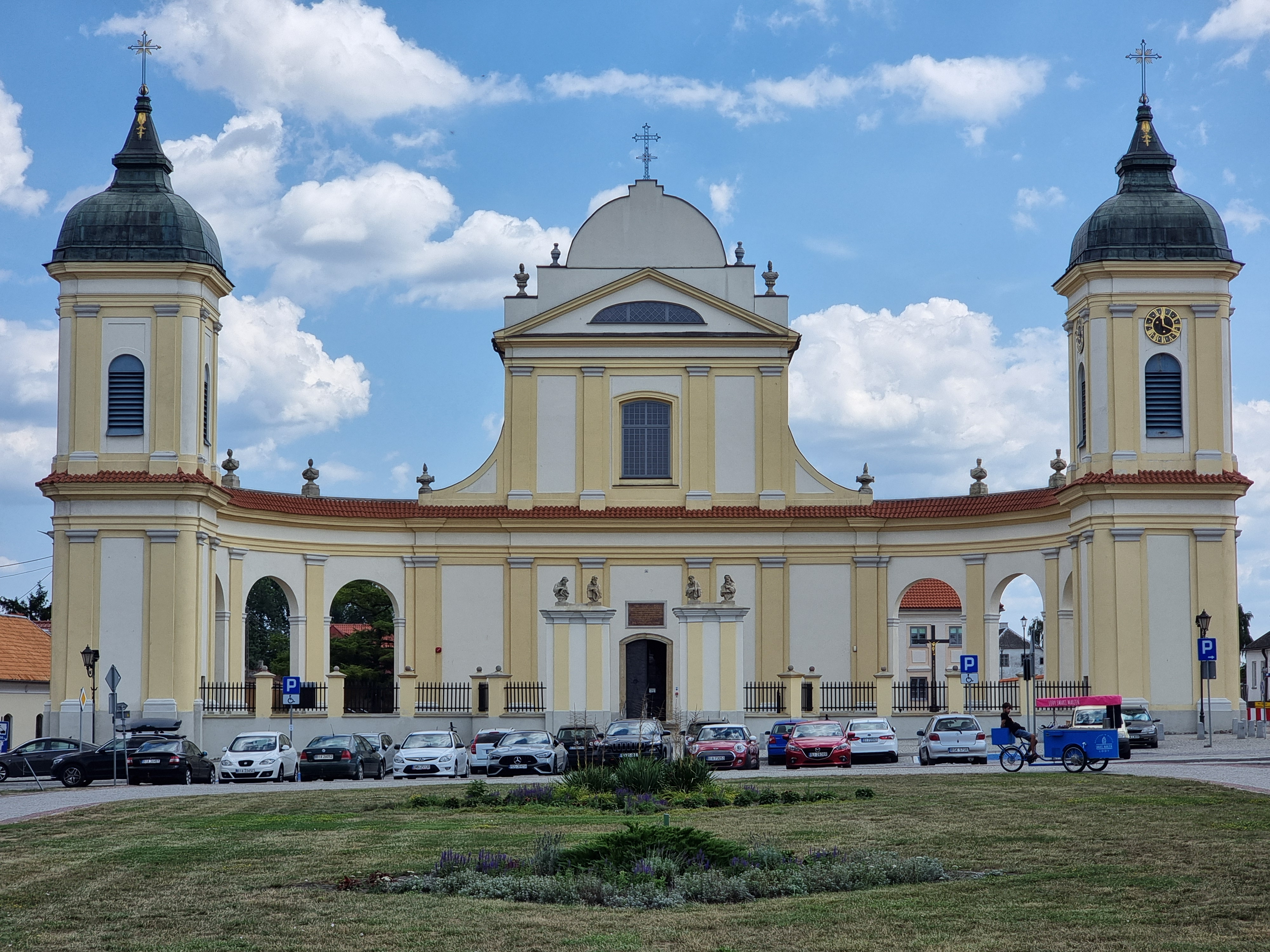
Holy Trinity church, Tykocin

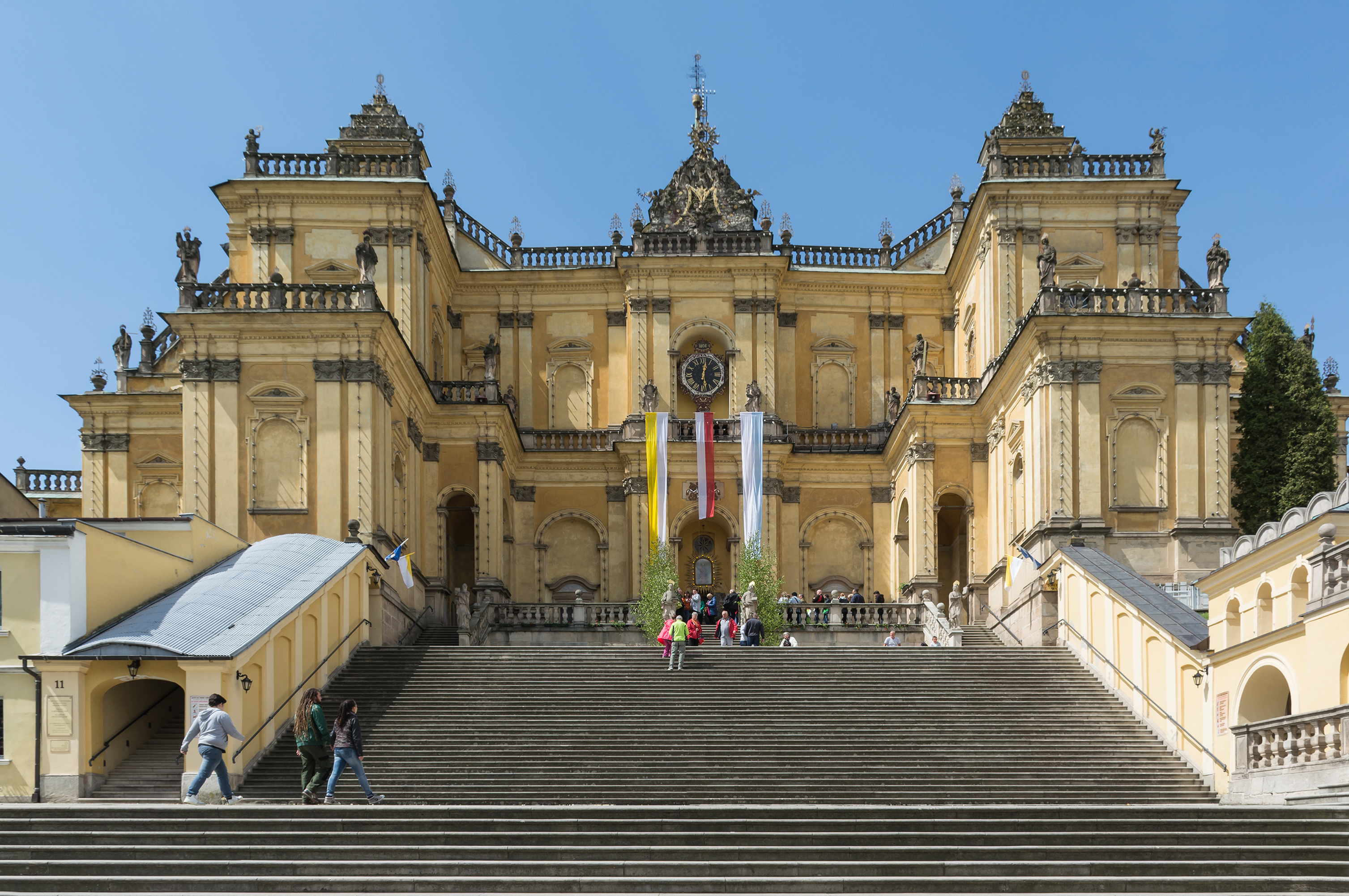
Basilica of the Visitation, Wambierzyce
Palaces

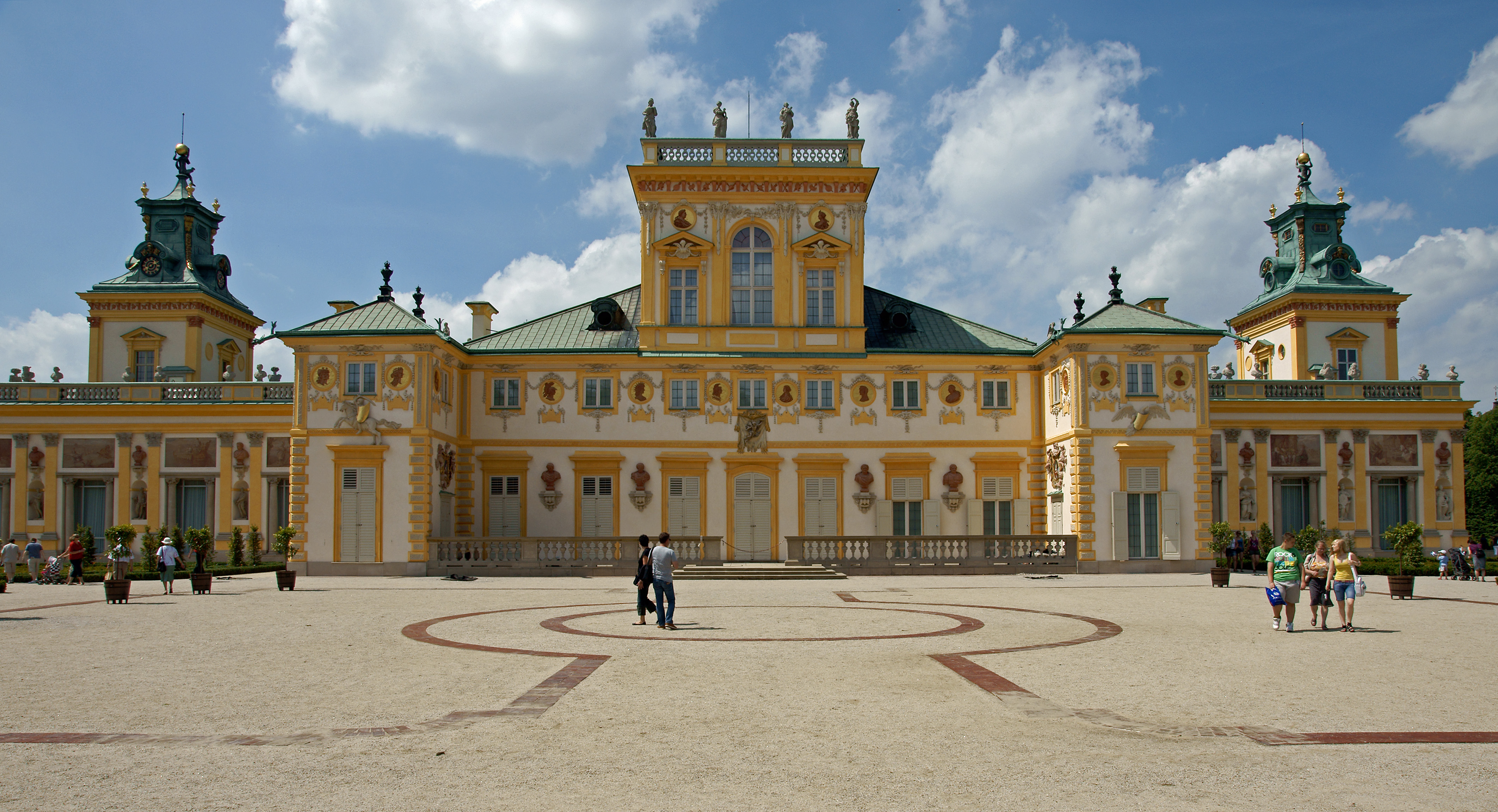
Wilanów Palace, Warsaw

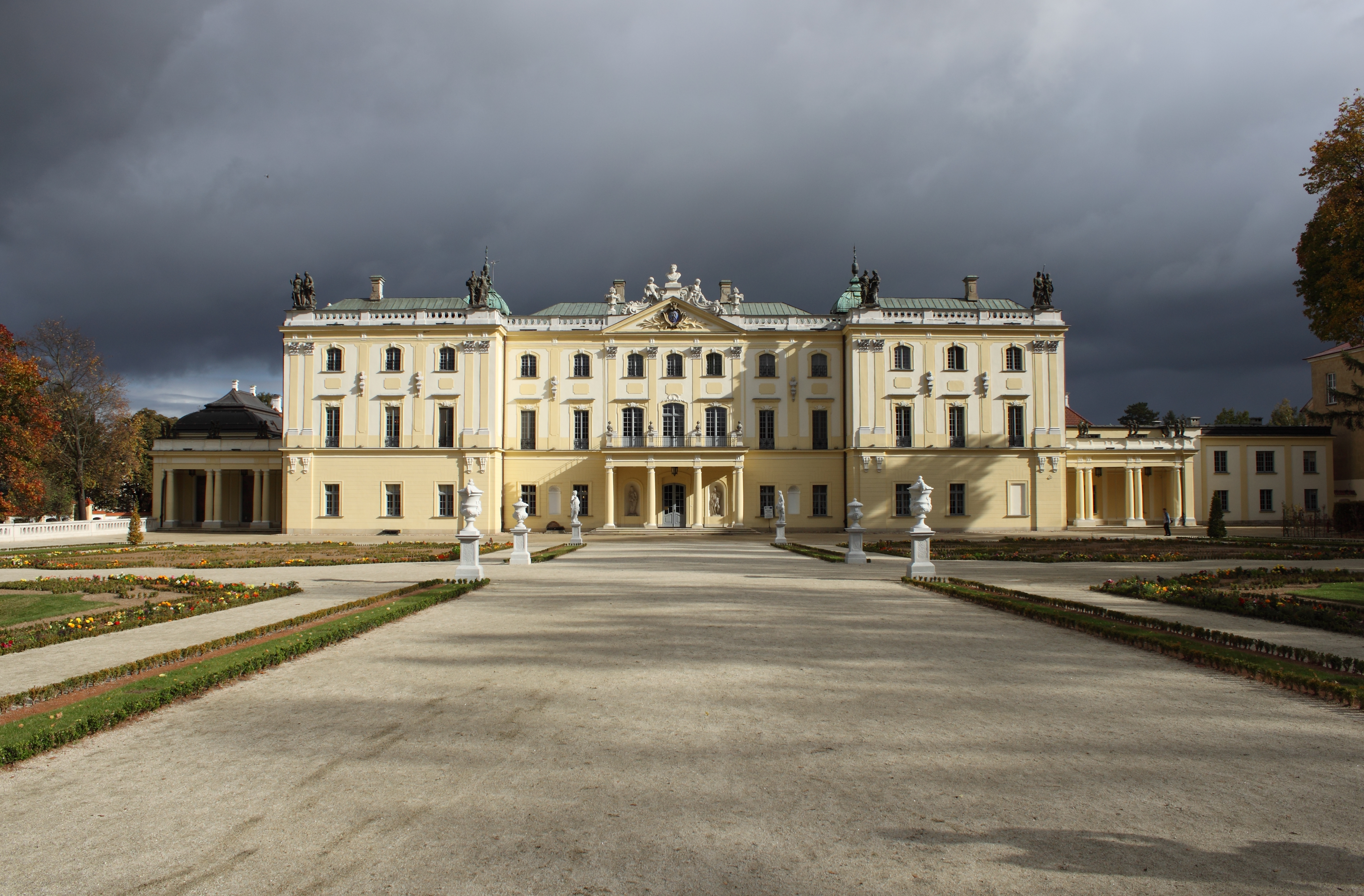
Branicki Palace, Białystok

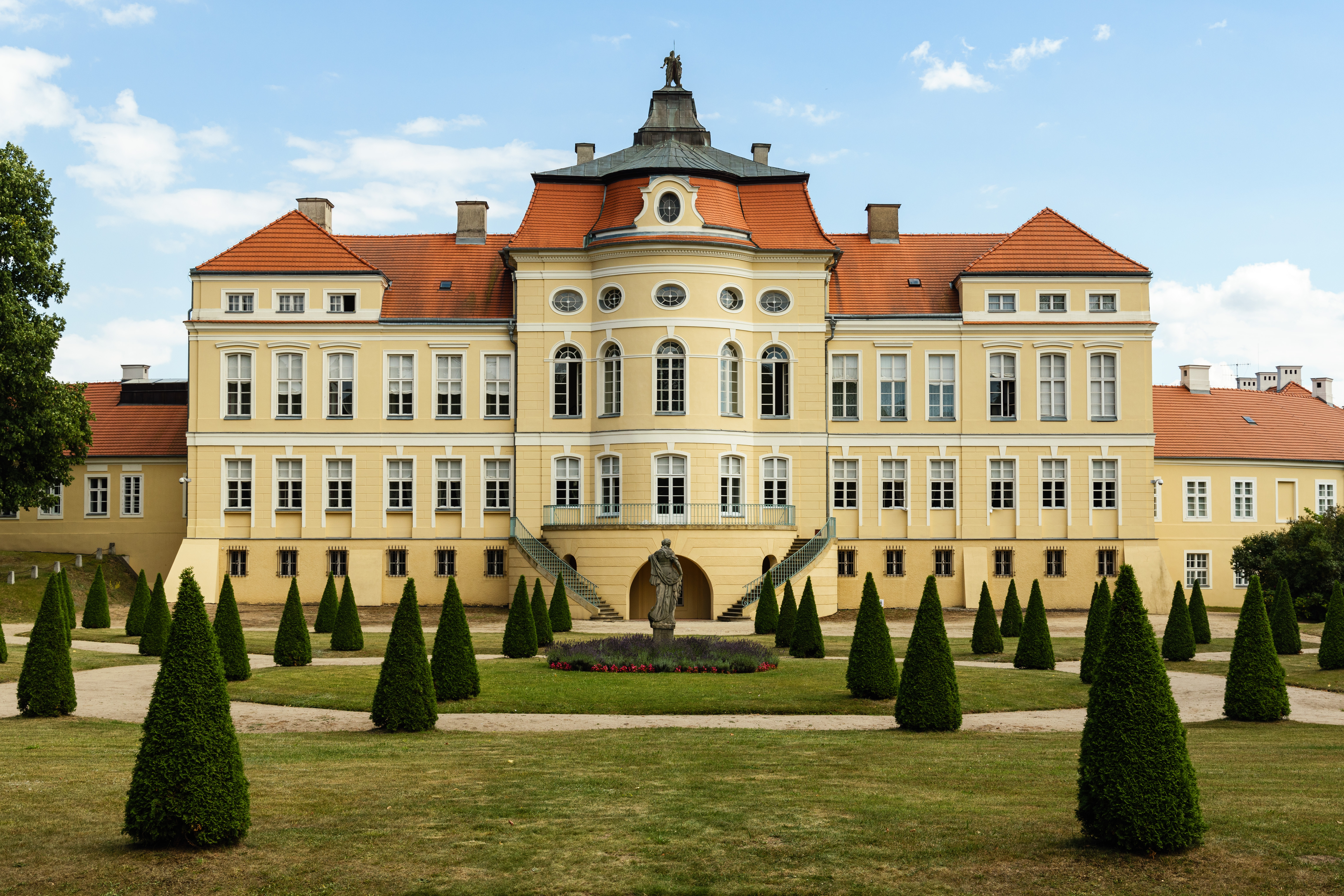
Raczyński Palace, Rogalin

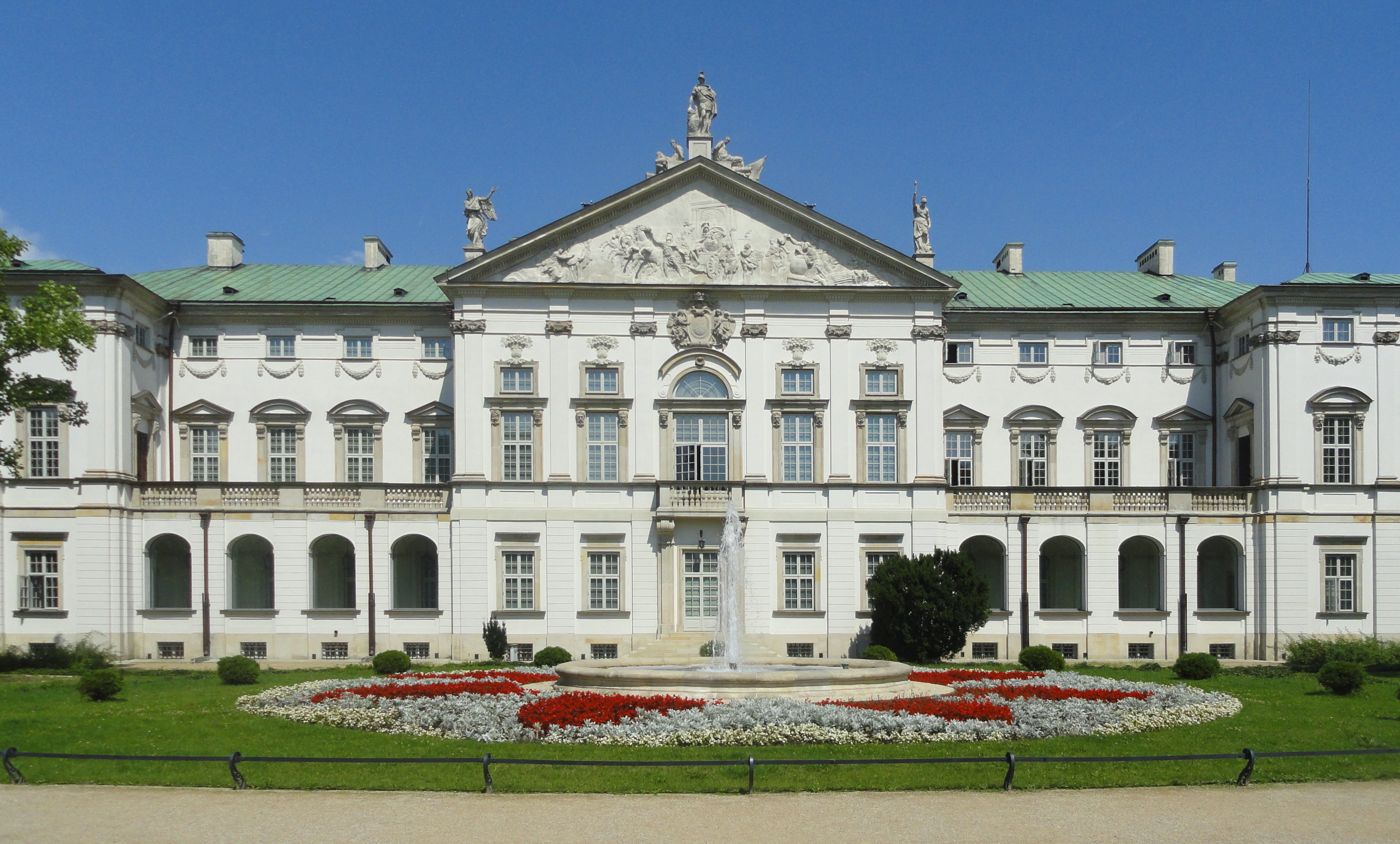
Krasiński Palace, Warsaw

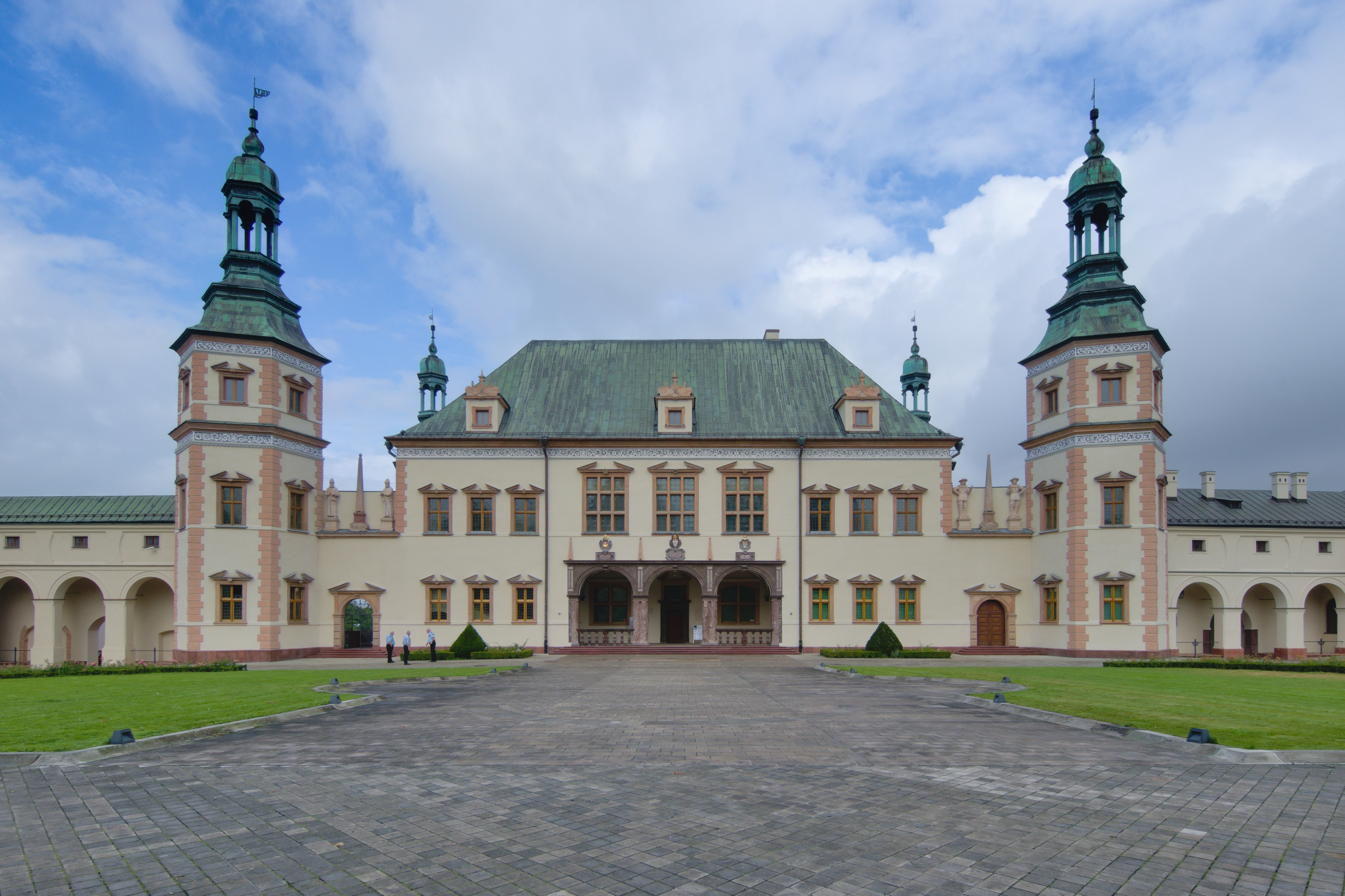
Kraków Bishops Palace, Kielce

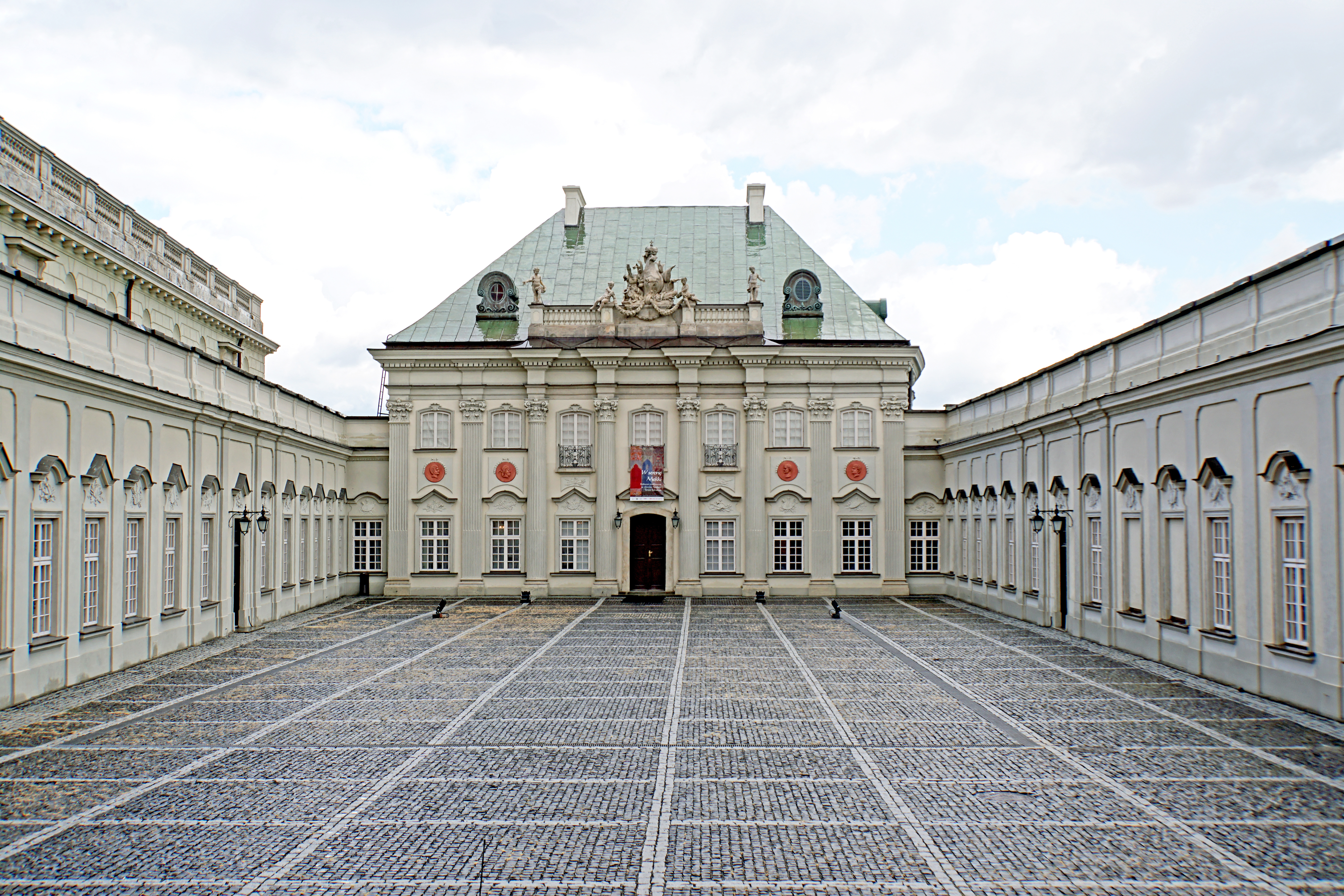
Copper-Roof Palace, Warsaw

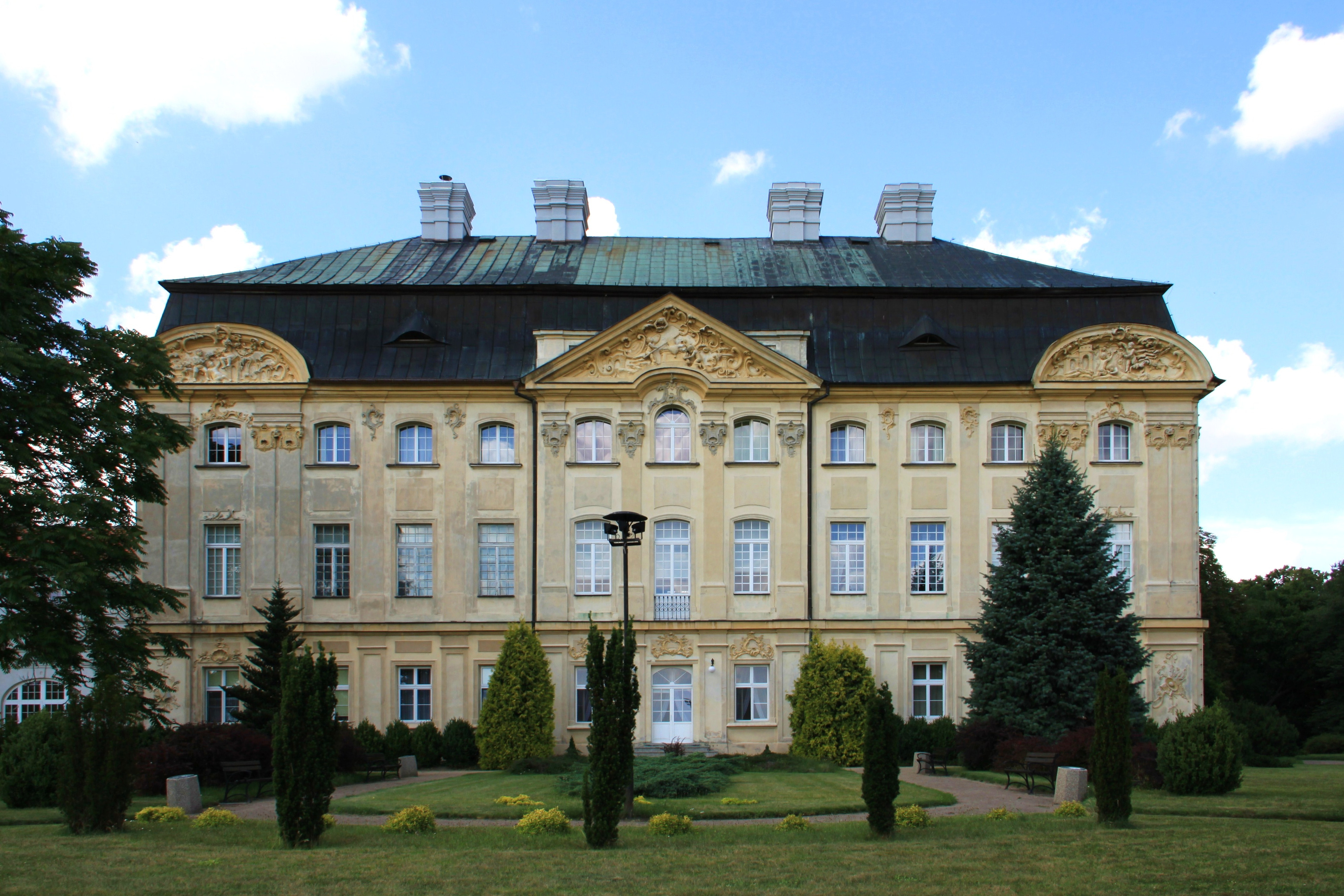
Ciążeń

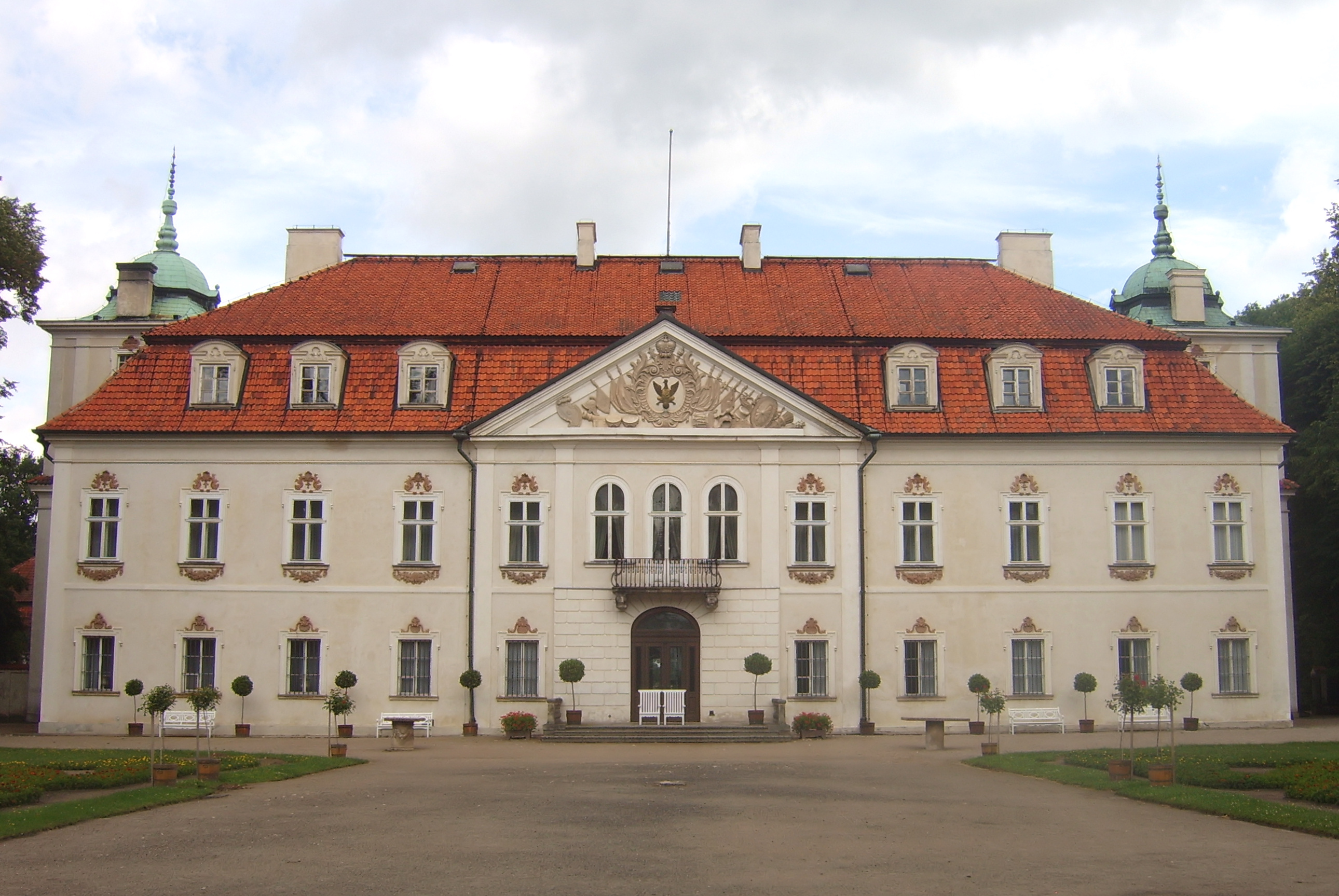
Nieborów

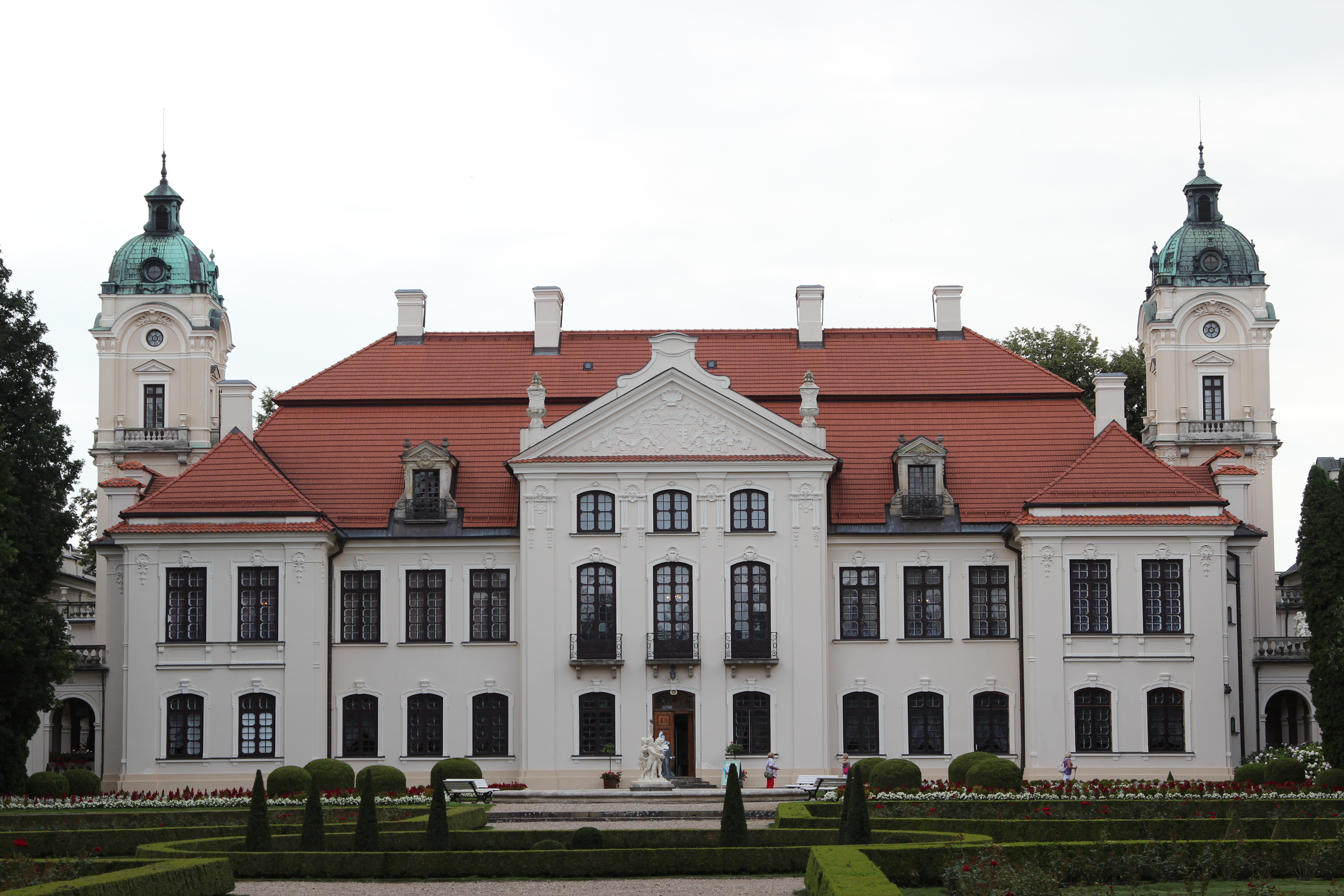
Zamoyski Palace, Kozłówka

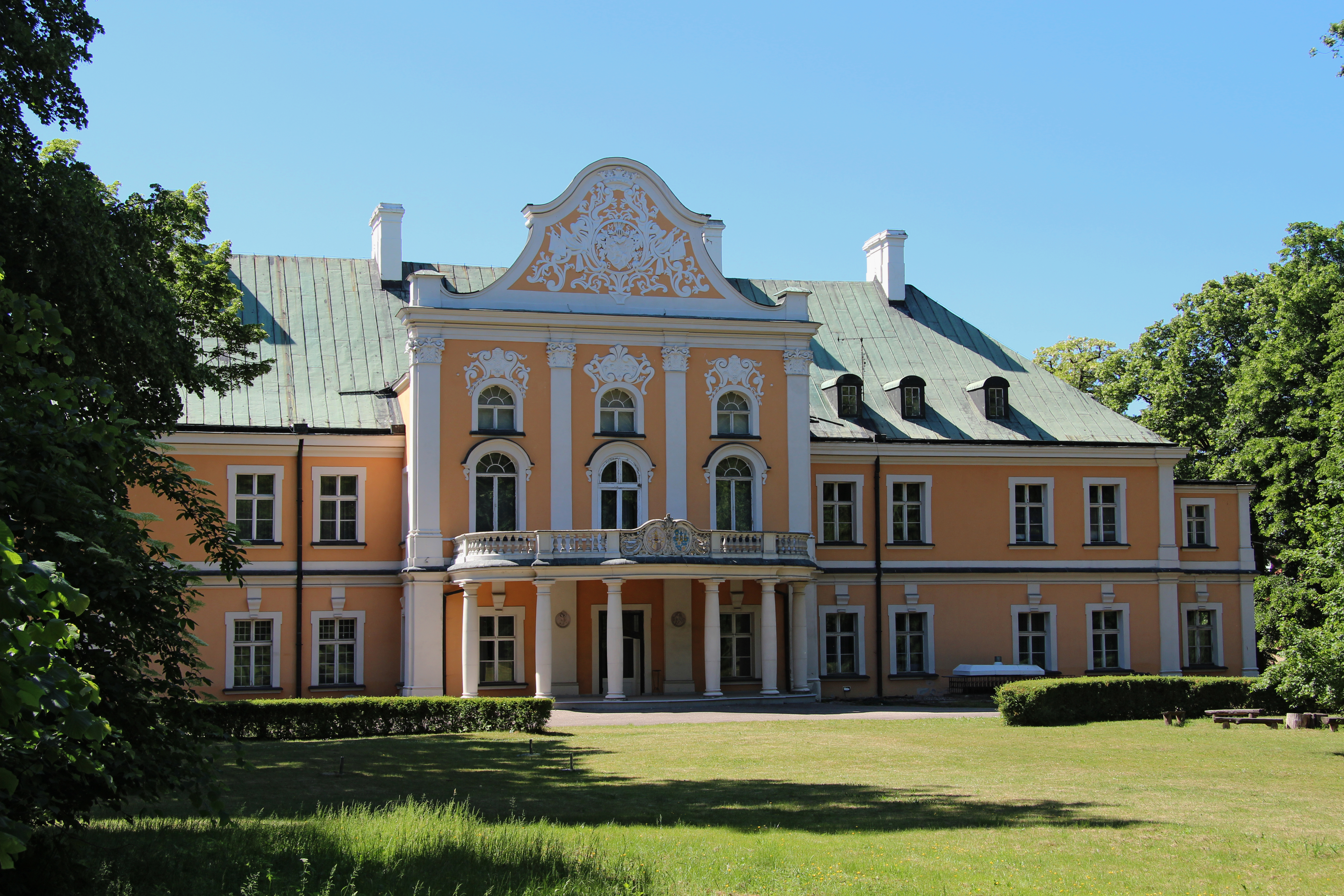
Szołdrski Palace, Czempiń
Castles

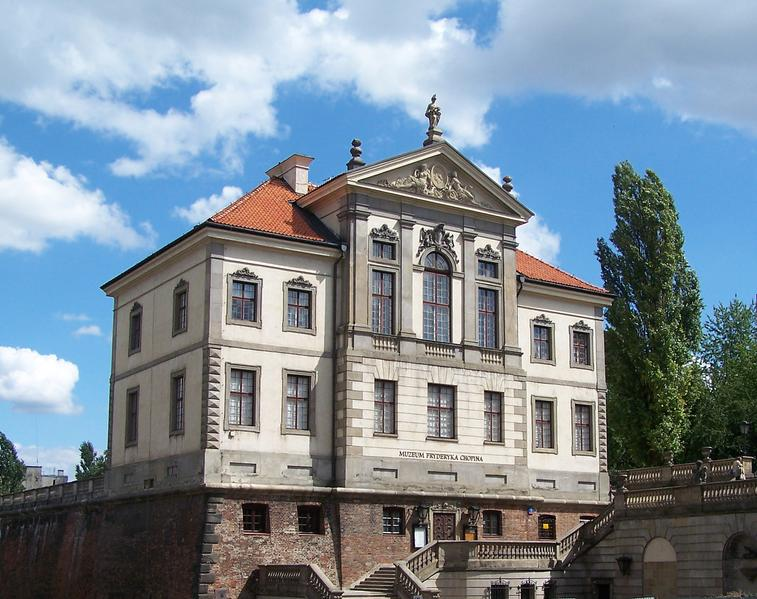
Ostrogski Castle, Warsaw

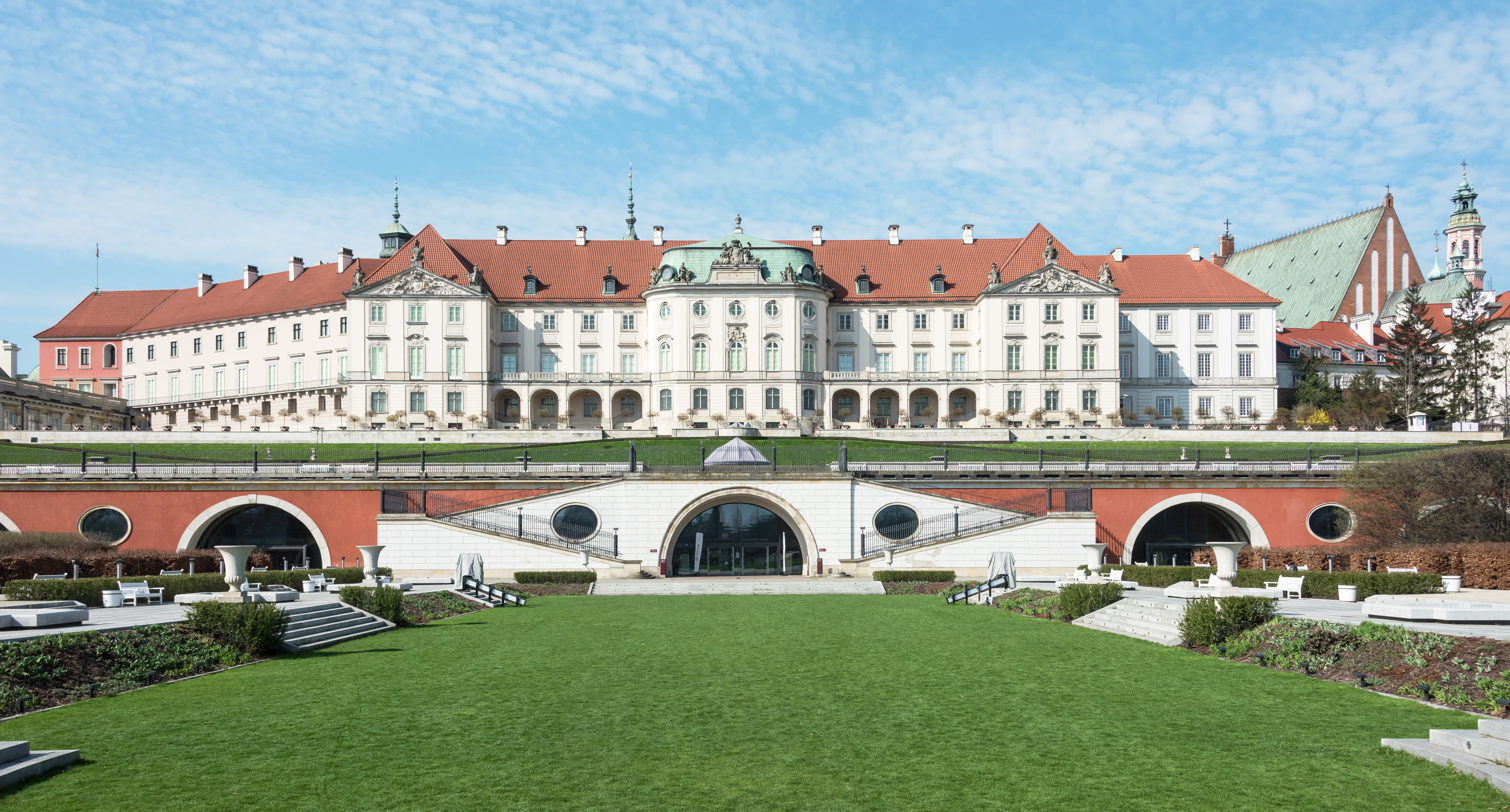
Royal Castle, Warsaw

Royal Castle, Rydzyna

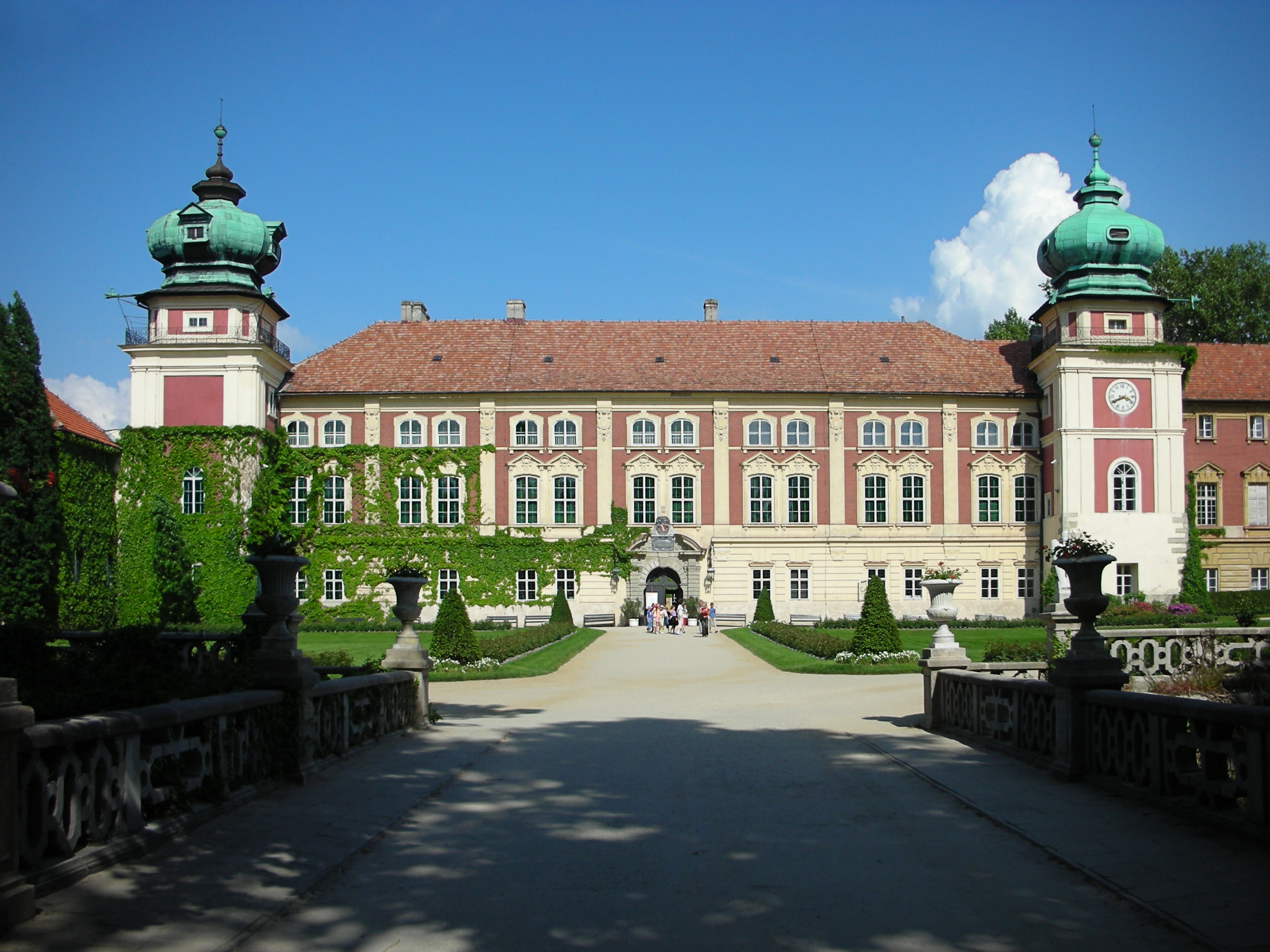
Łańcut Castle

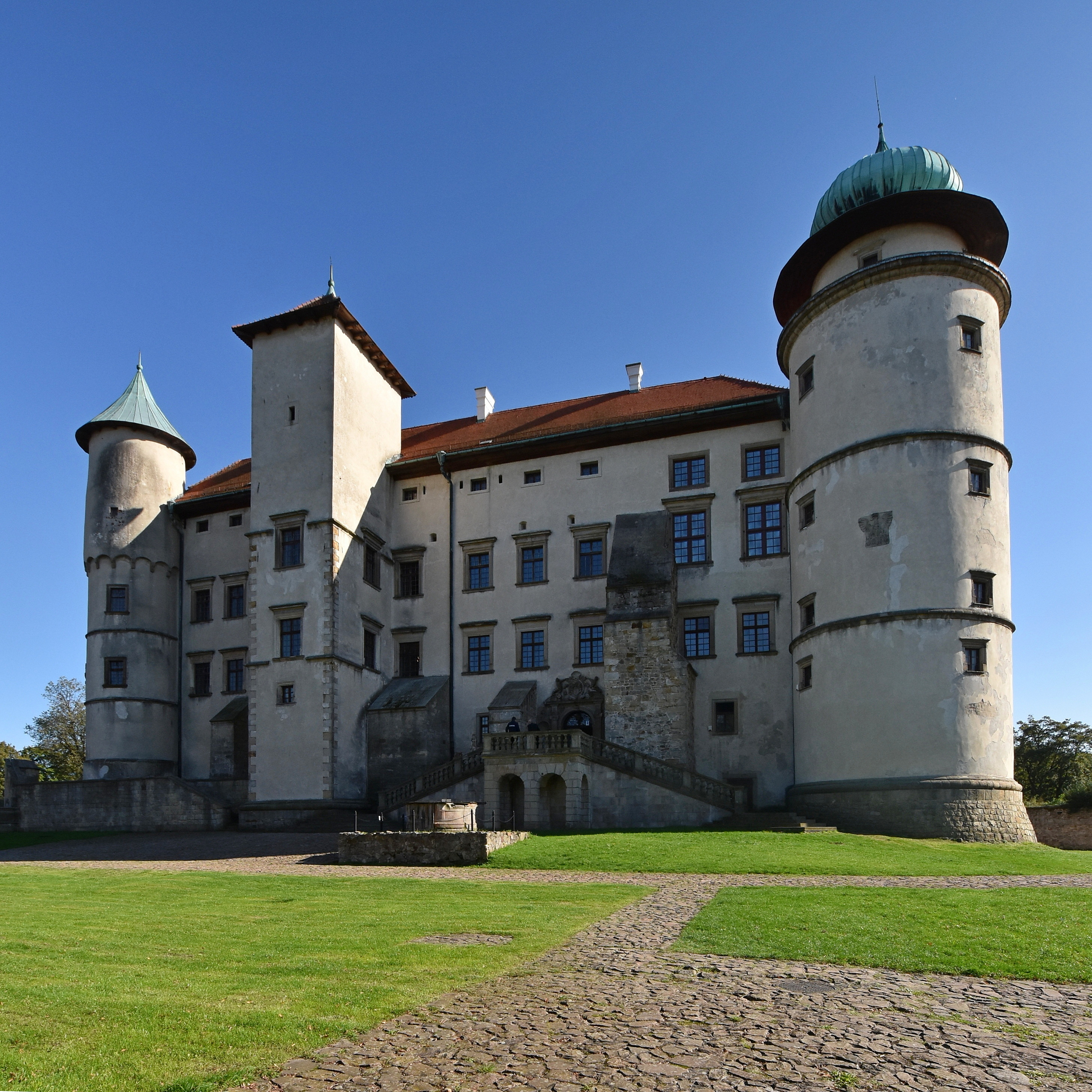
Wiśnicz Castle
Tenements

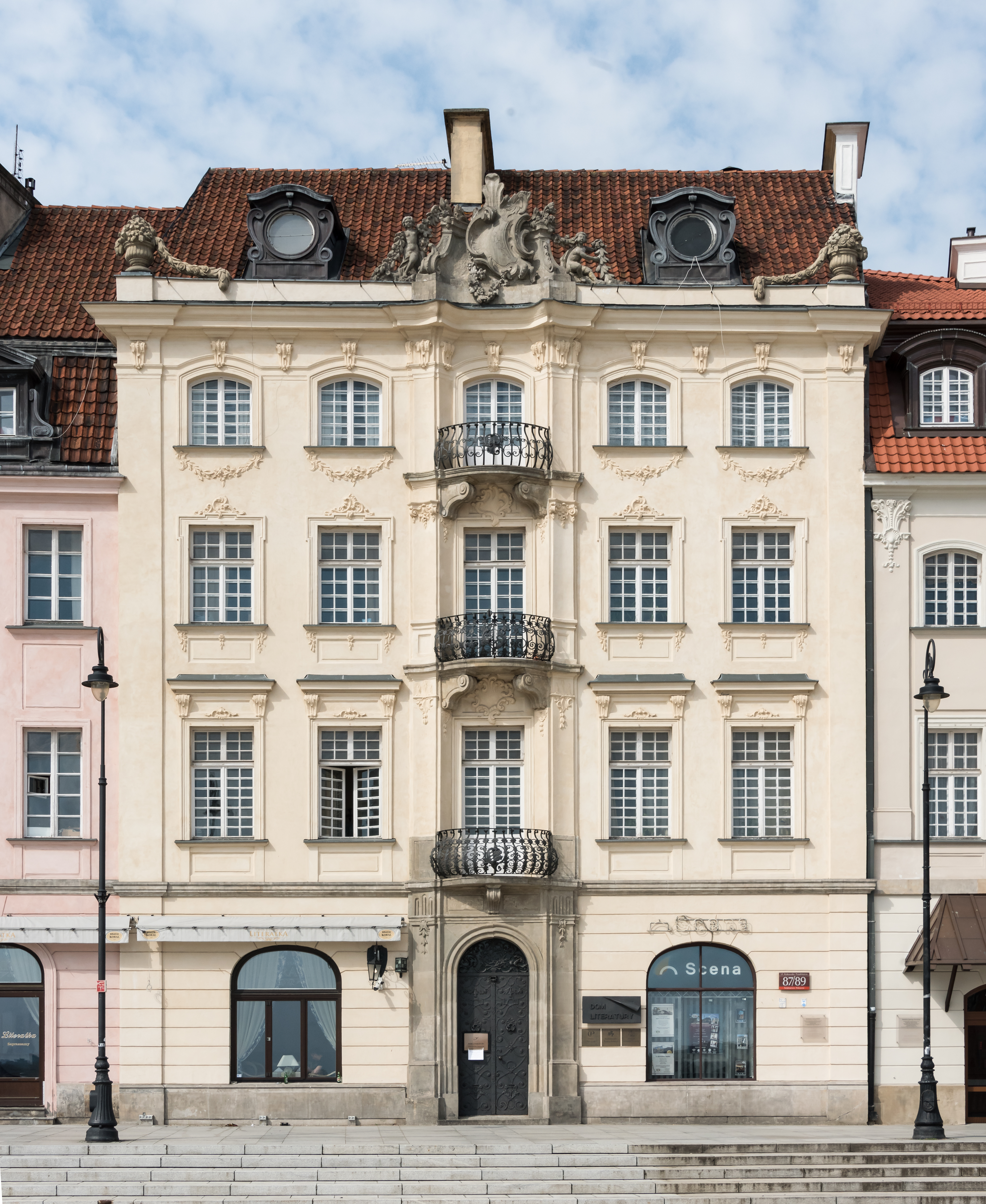
Warsaw

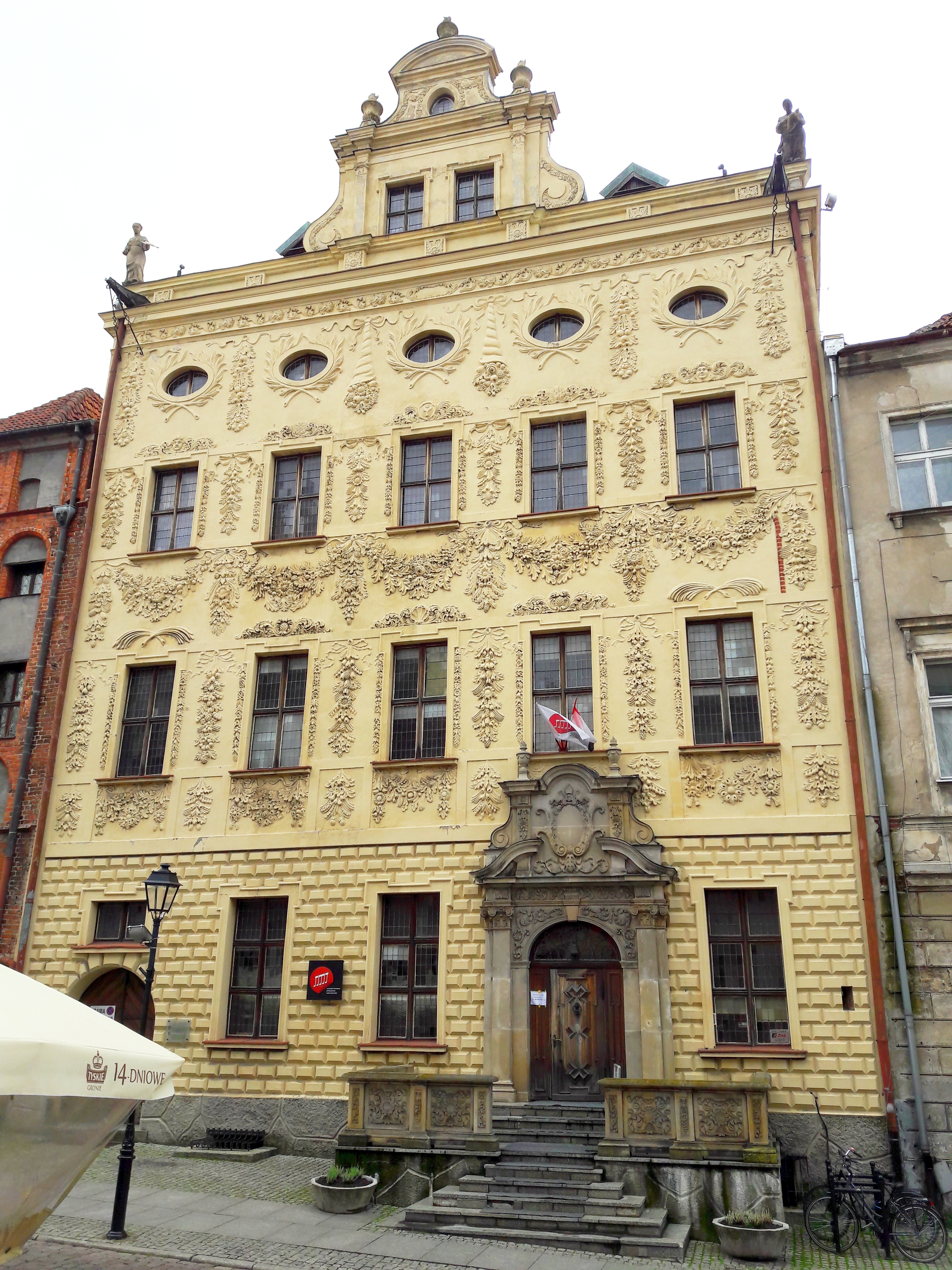
Toruń

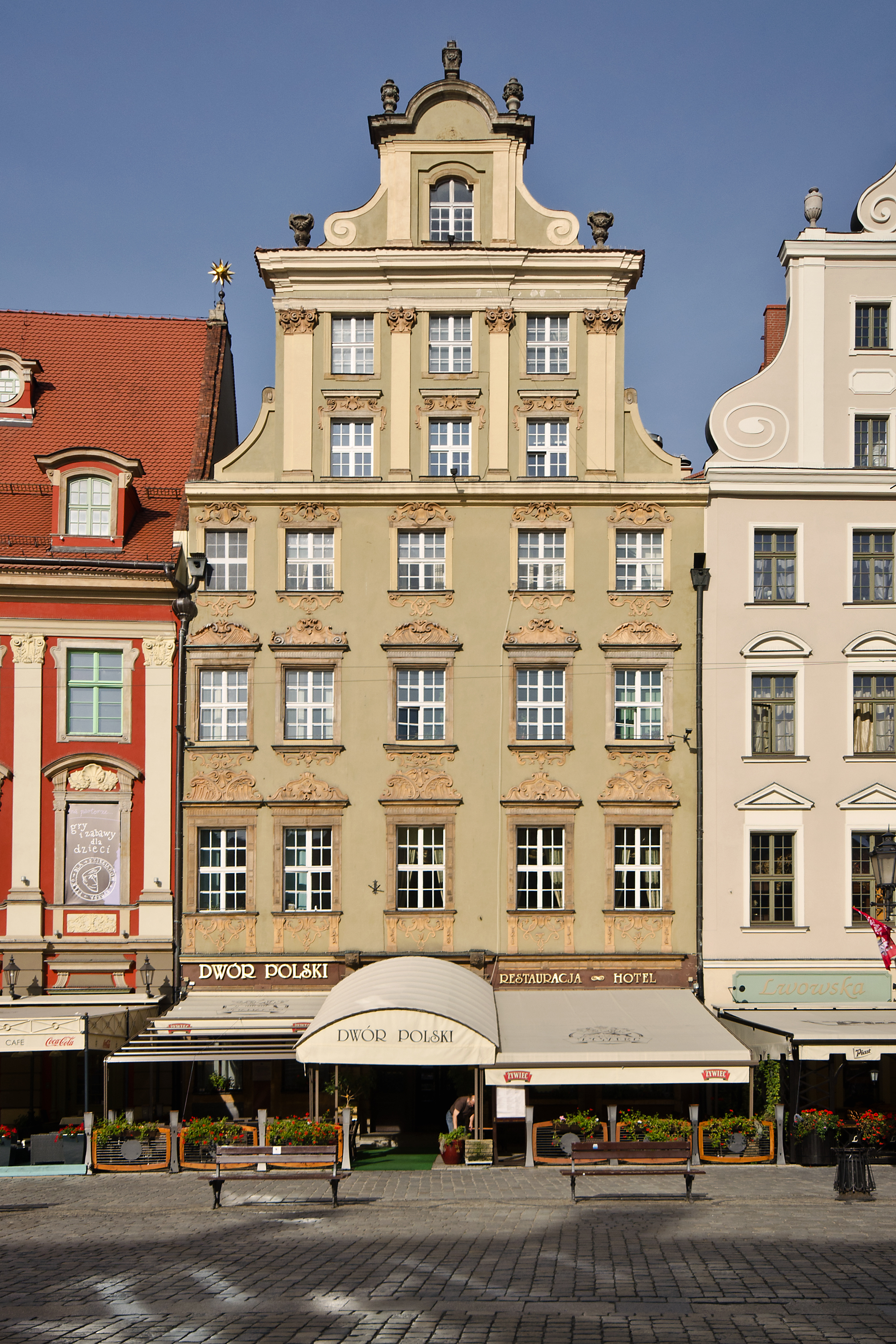
Wrocław

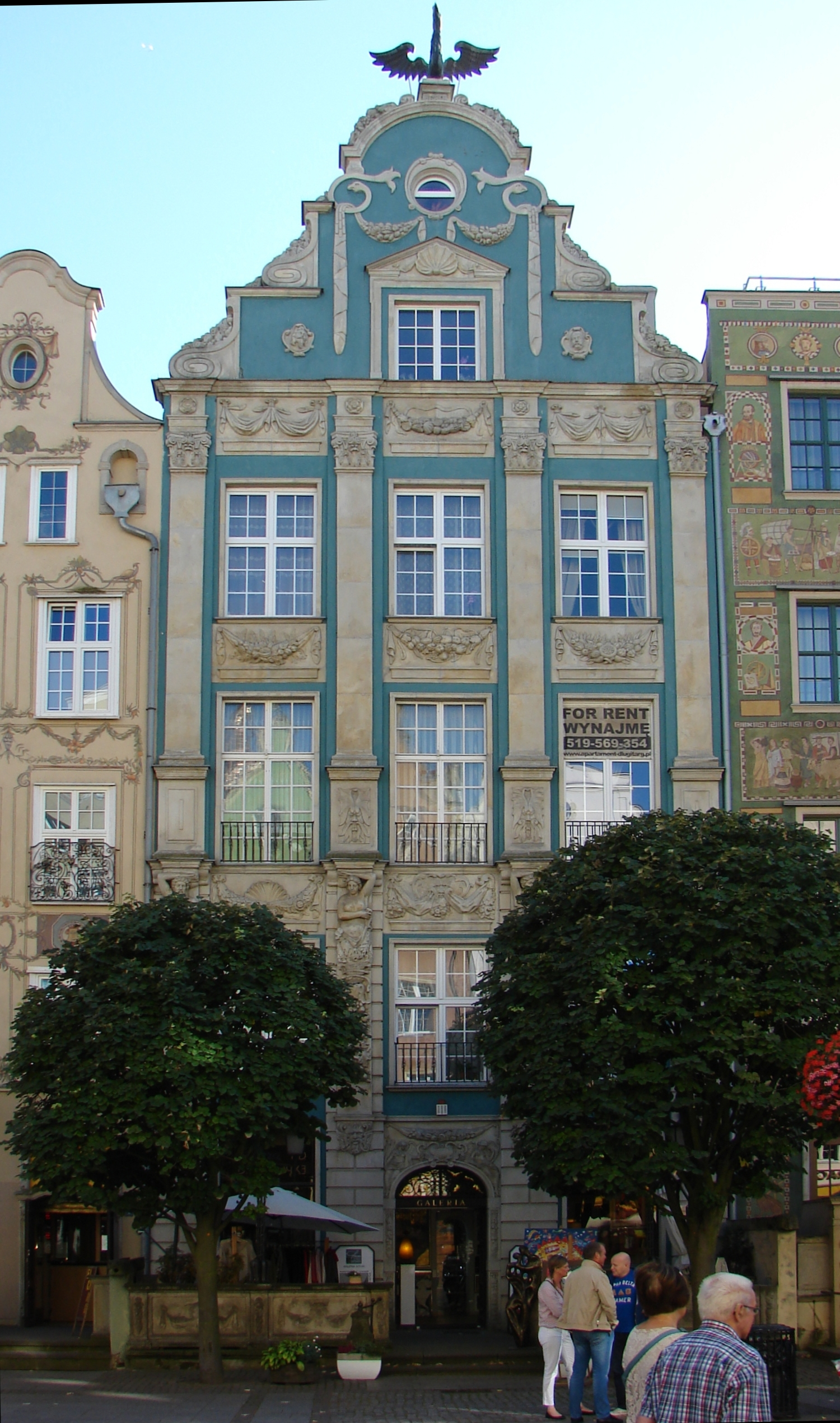
Gdańsk

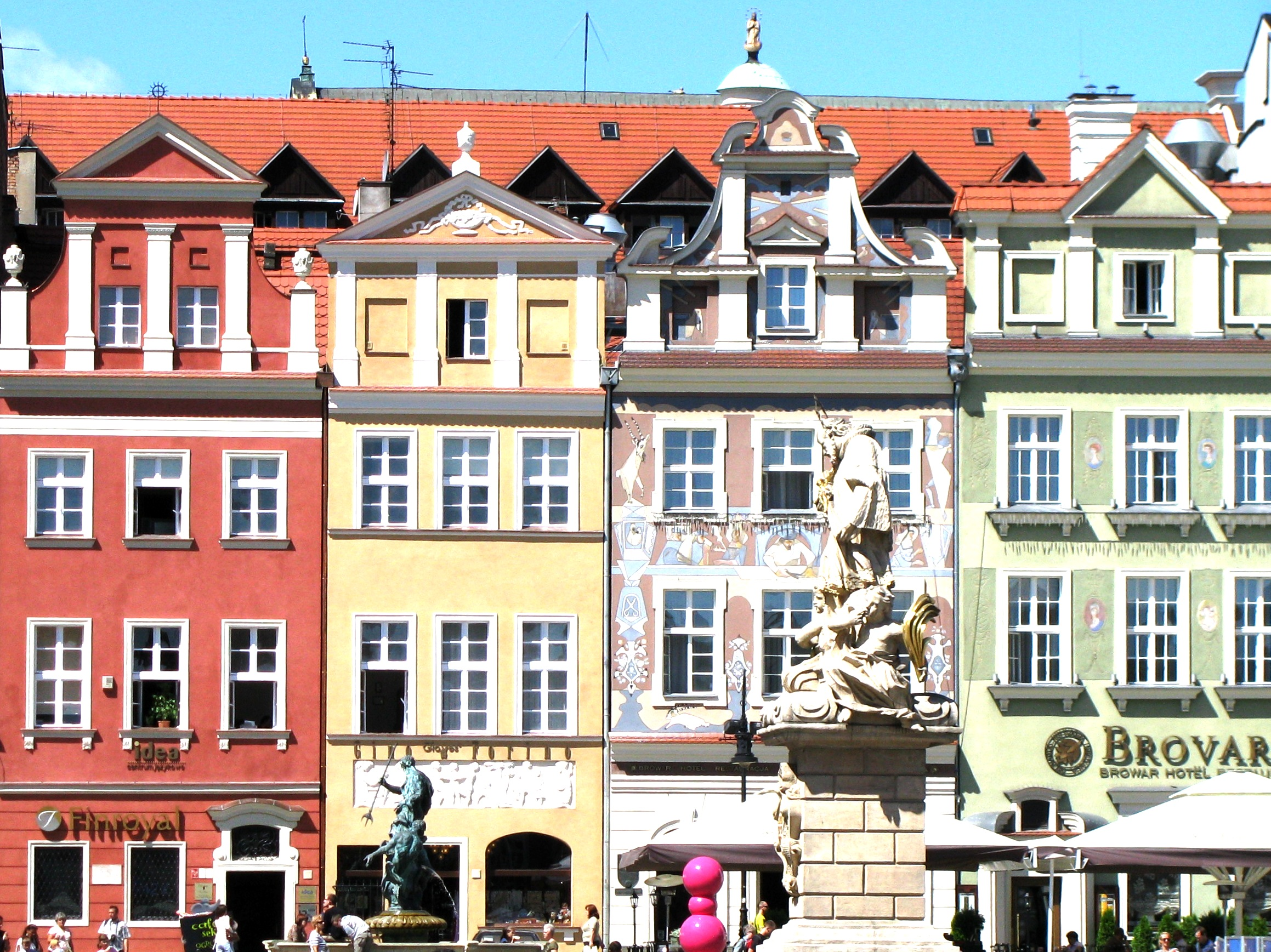
Poznań
Town halls

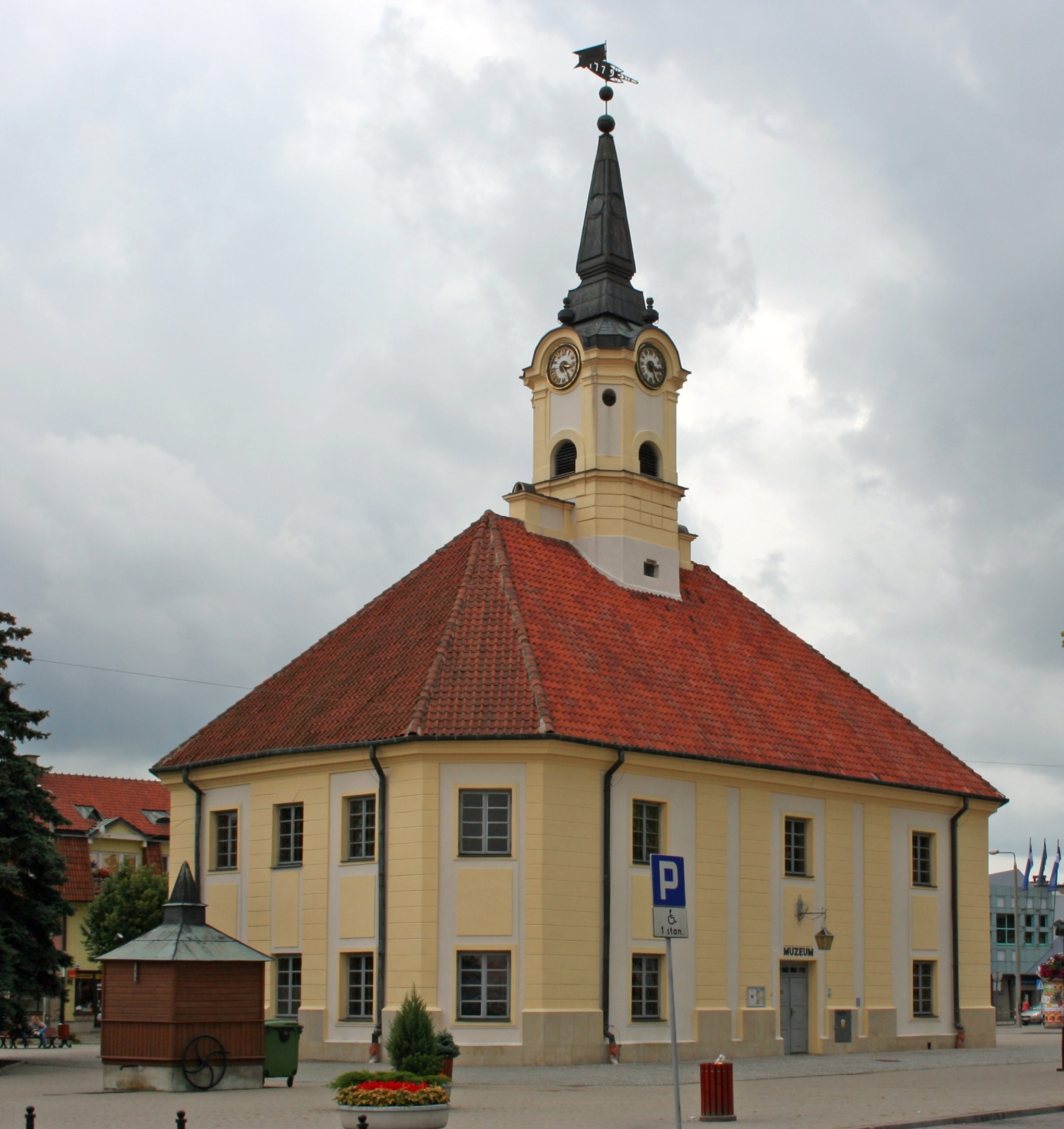
Bielsk Podlaski

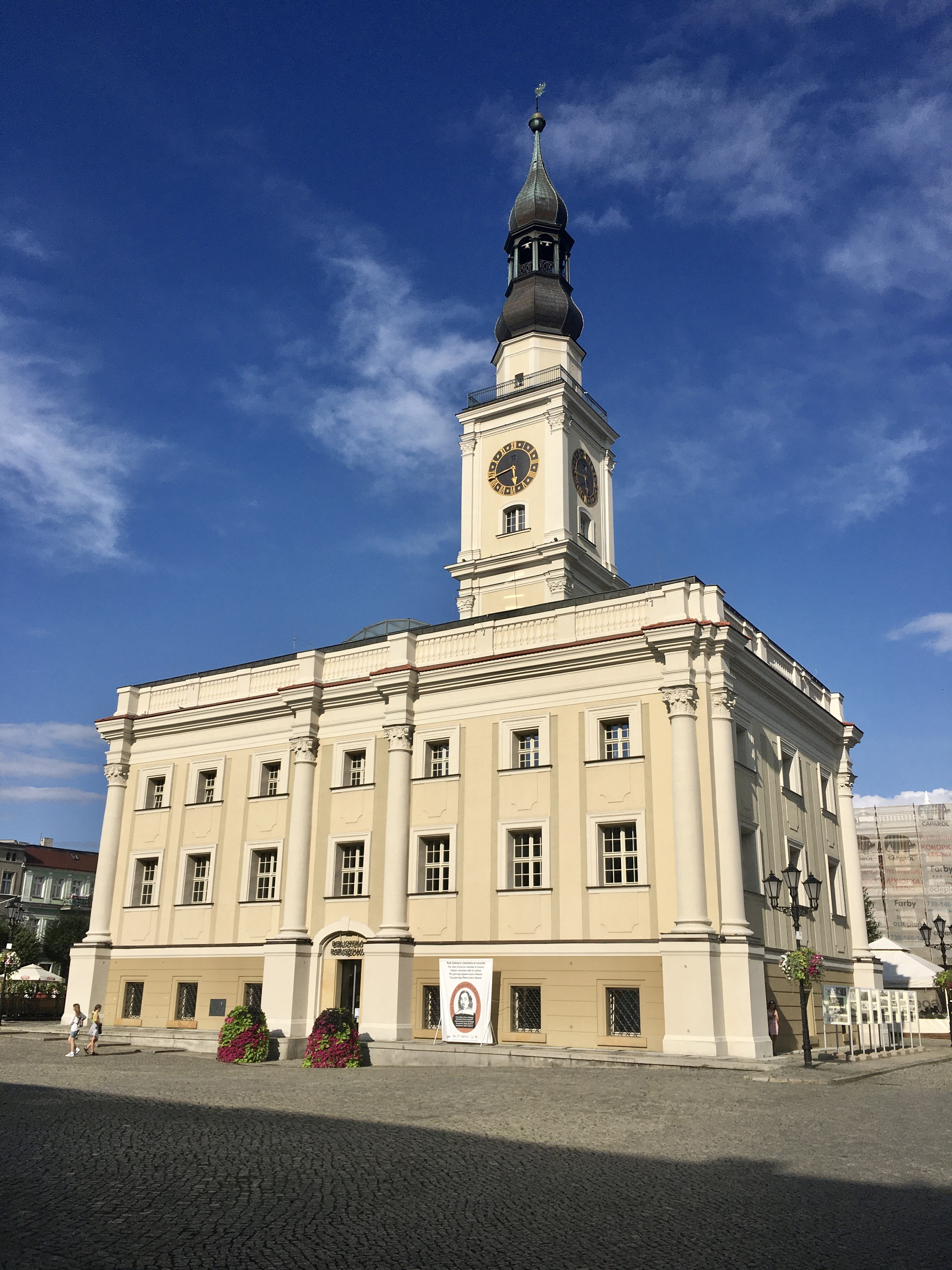
Leszno

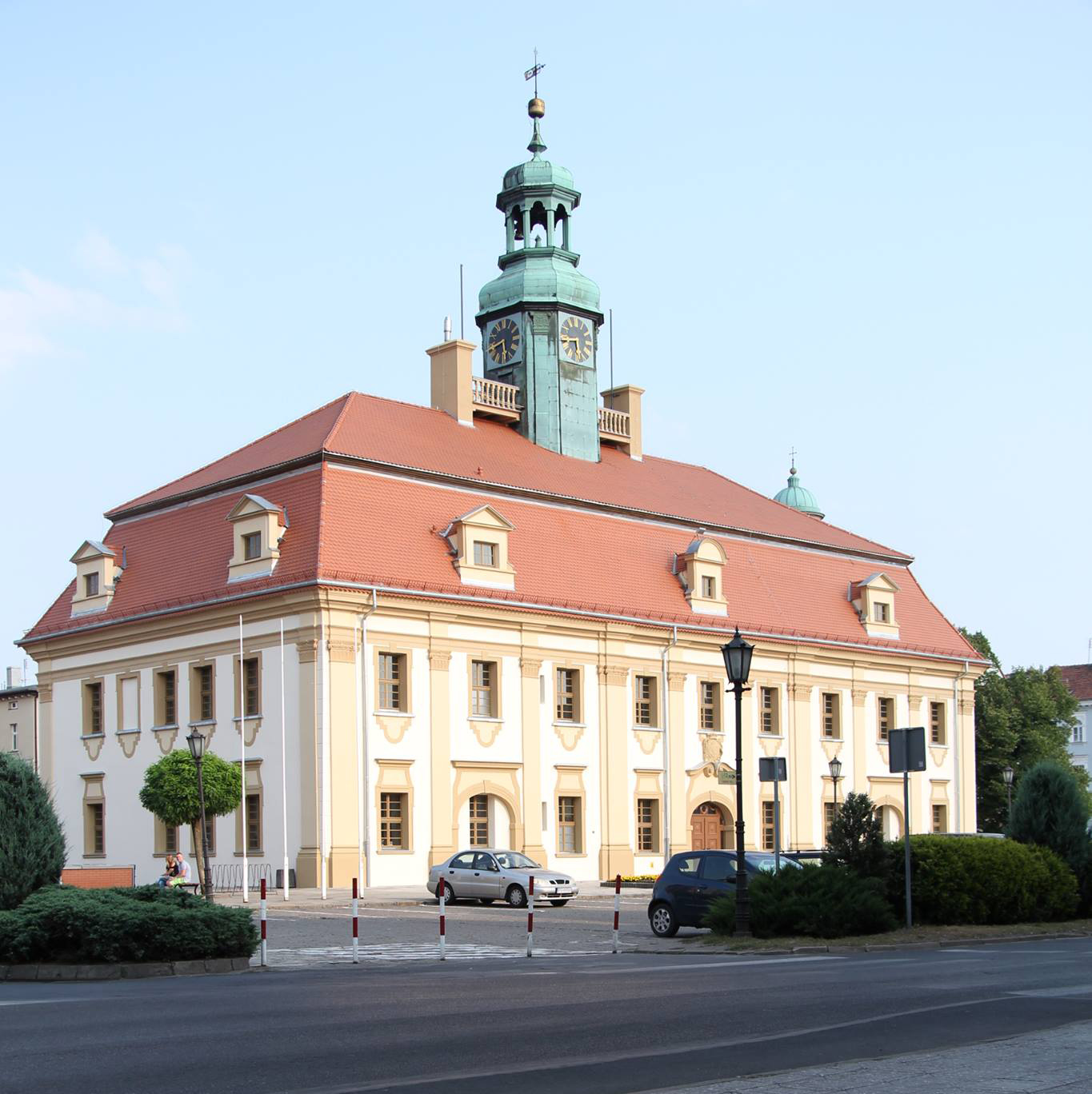
Rawicz

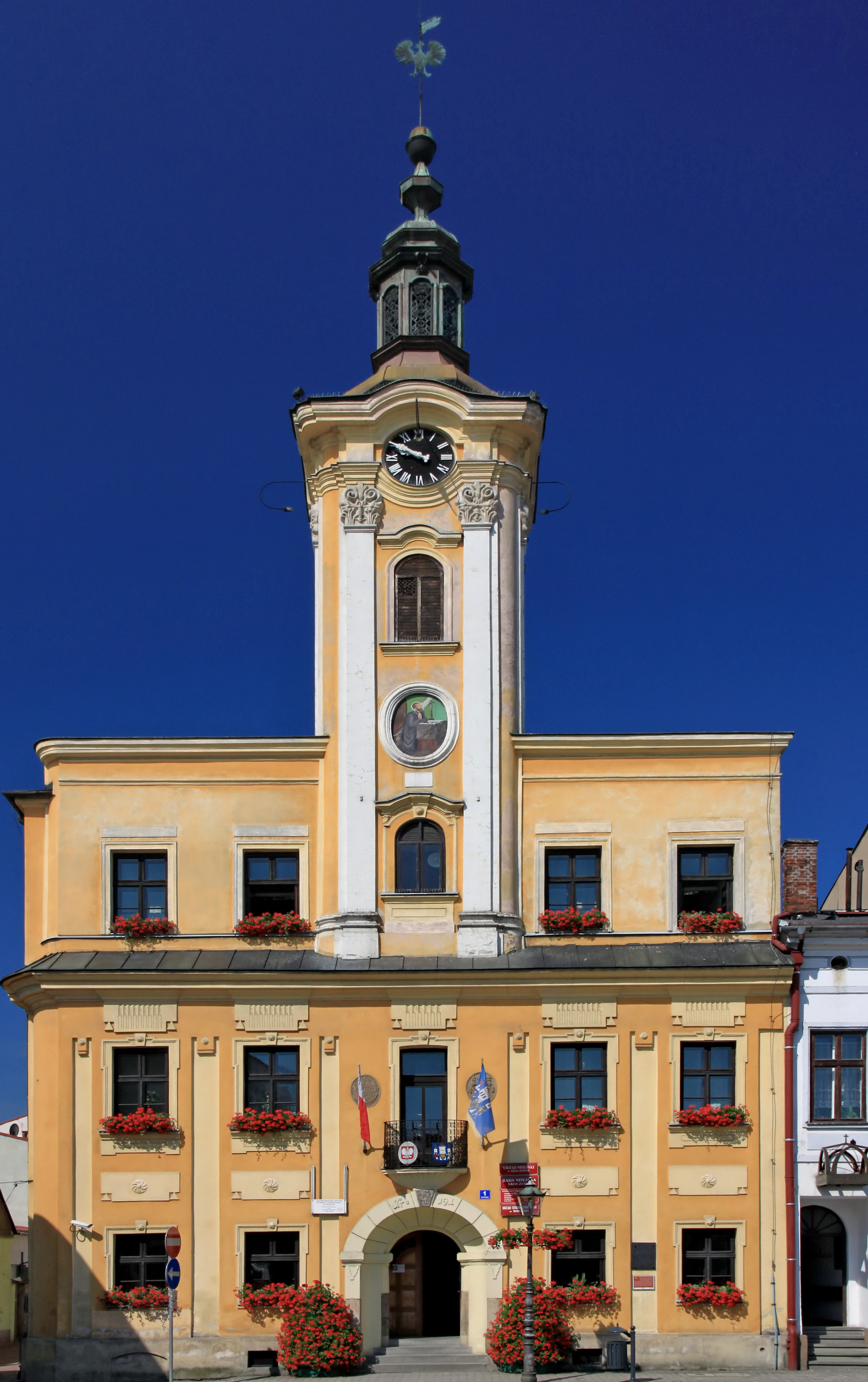
Skoczów

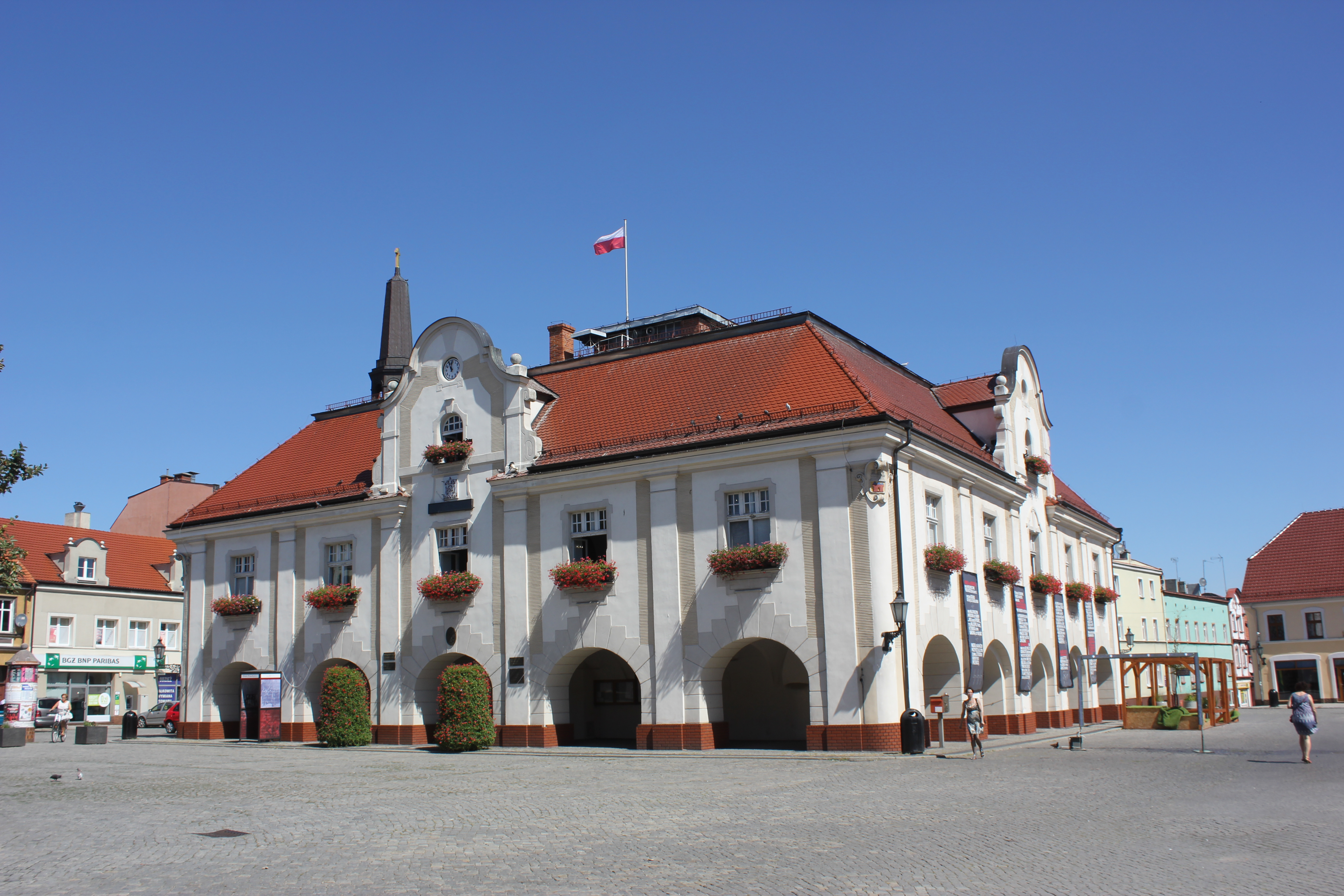
Jarocin
Interiors

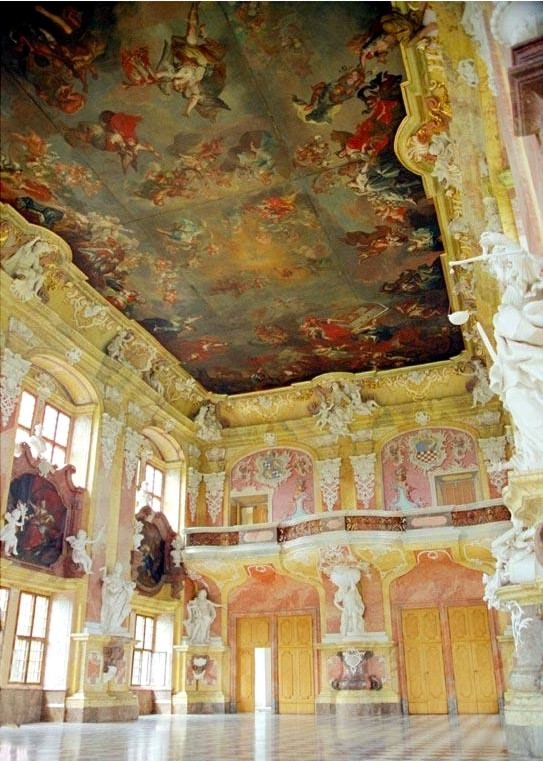
Lubiąż Abbey

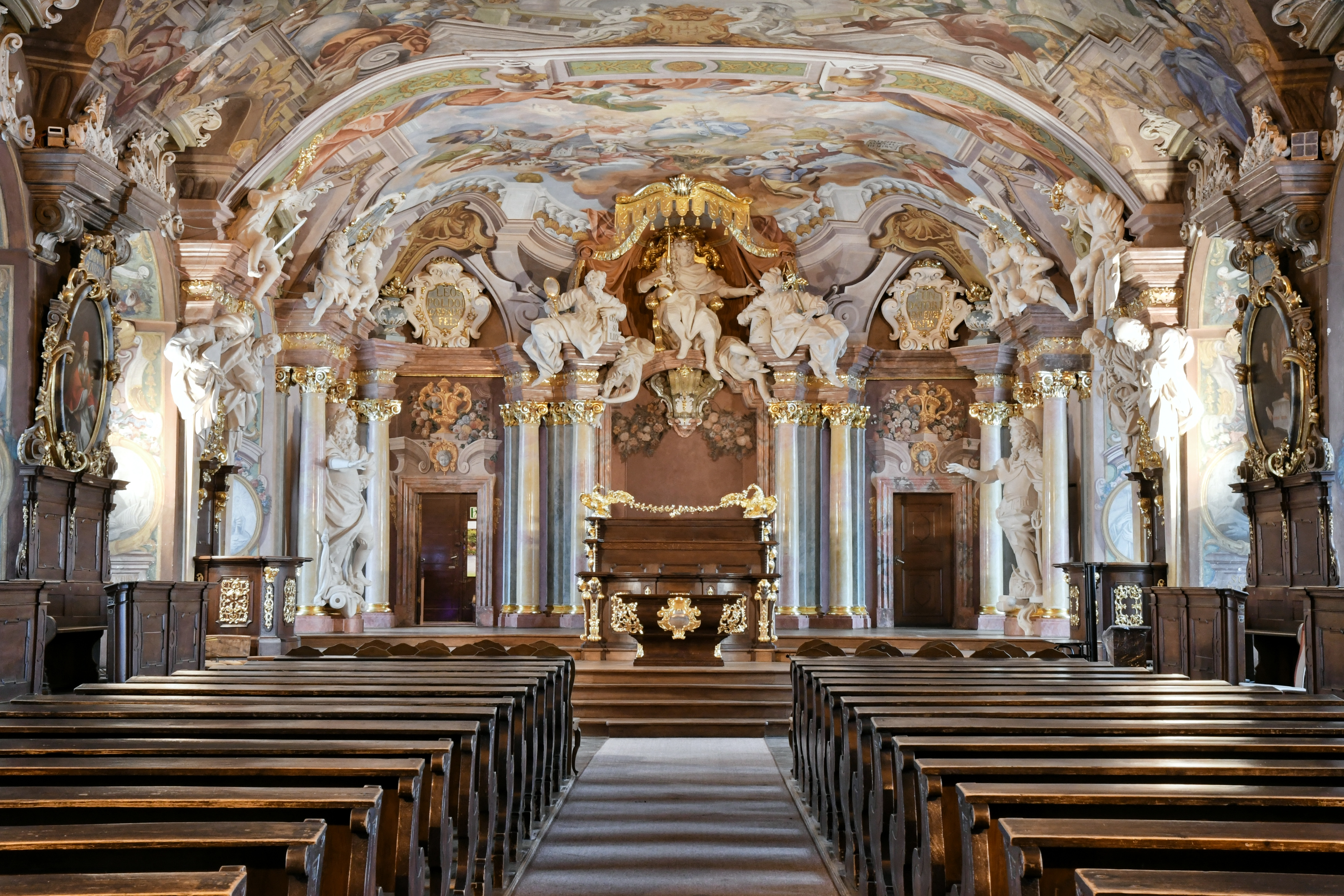
Leopoldina University in Wrocław

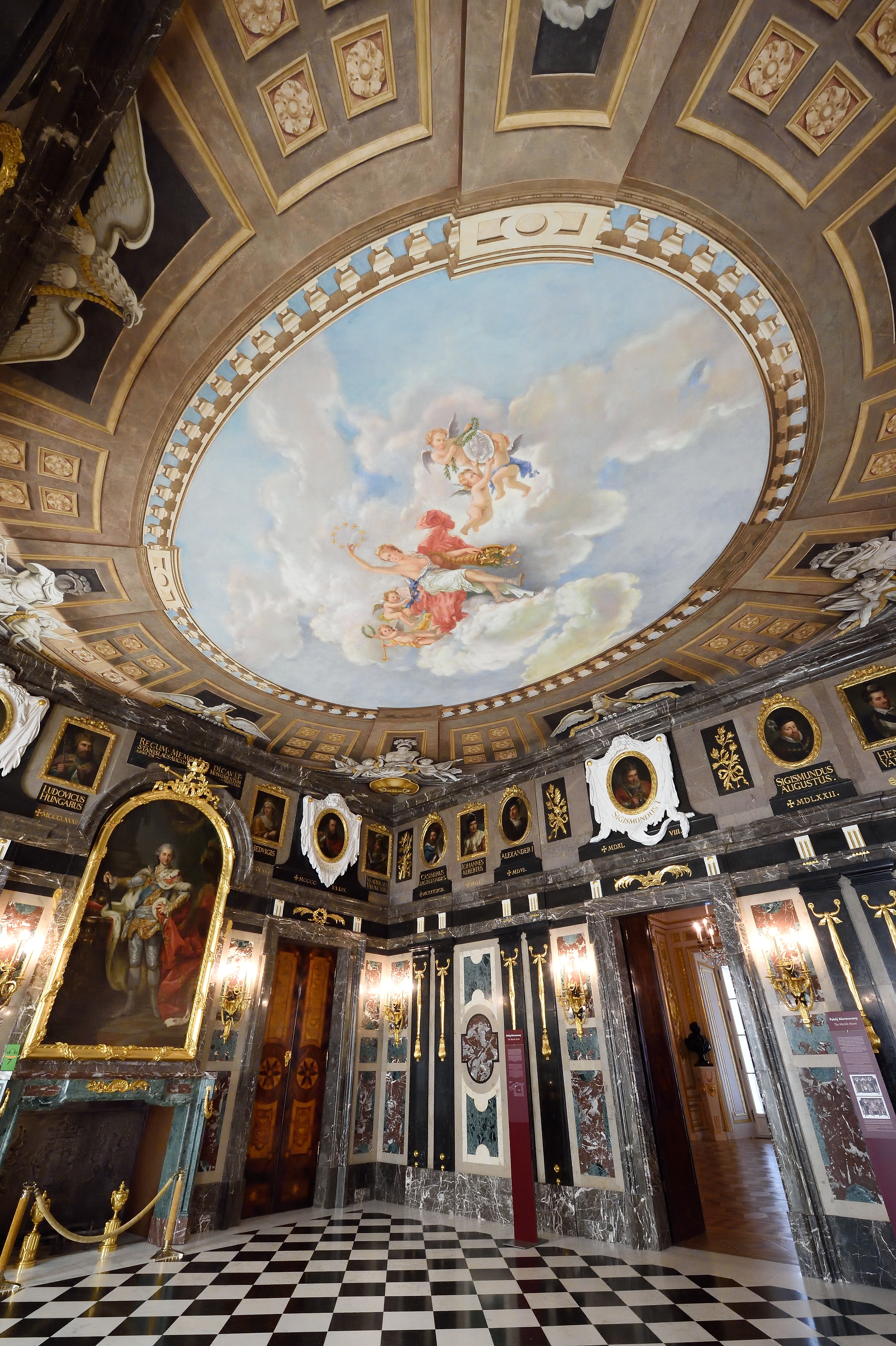
Royal Castle, Warsaw

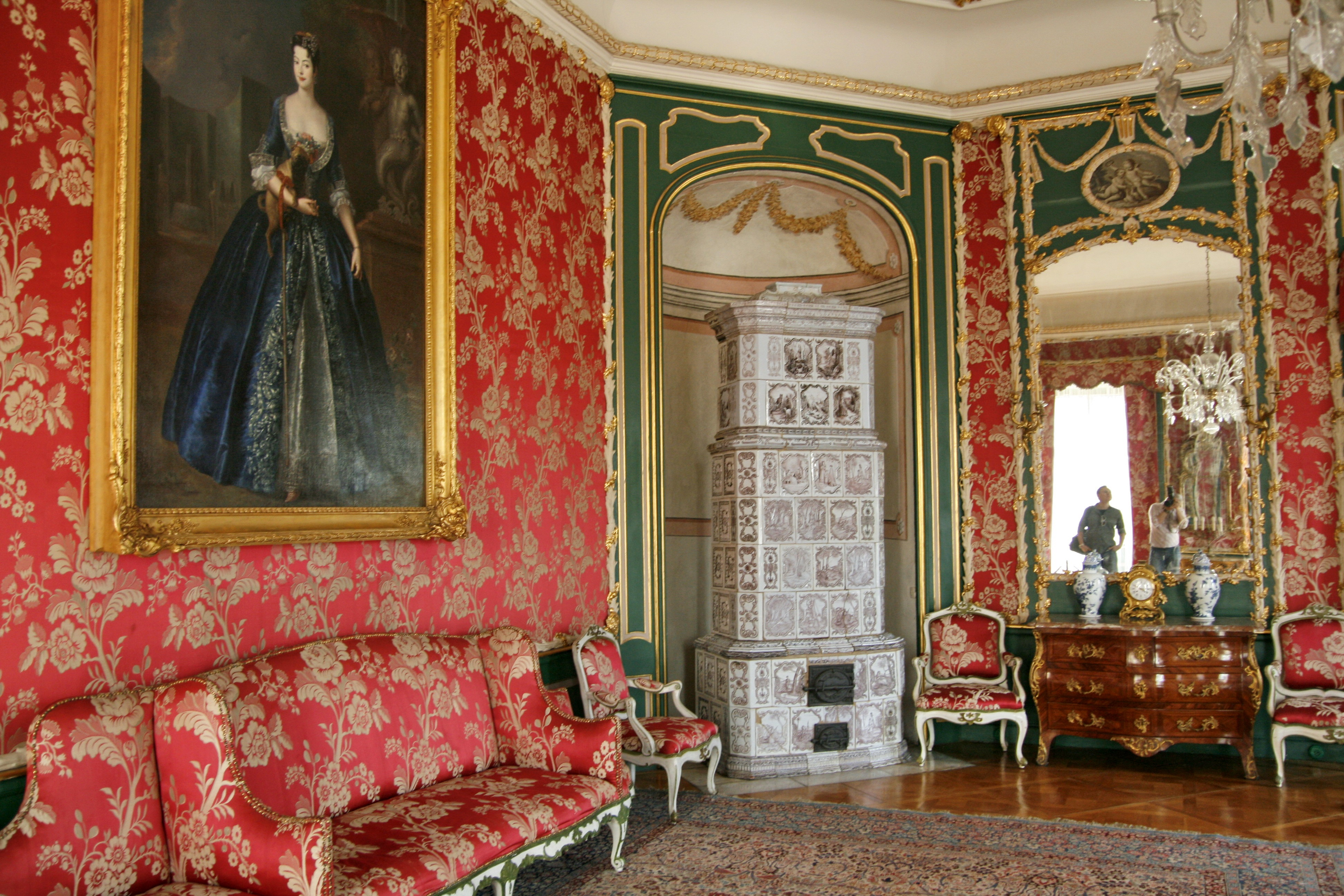
Palace in Nieborów

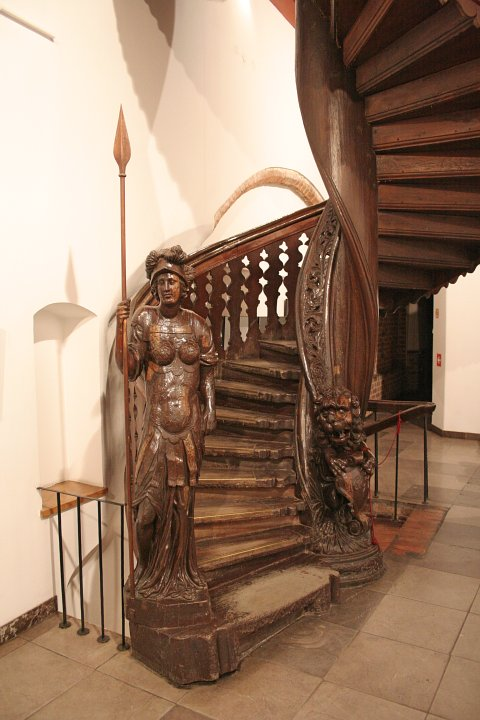
Star Tenement, Toruń
Church interiors

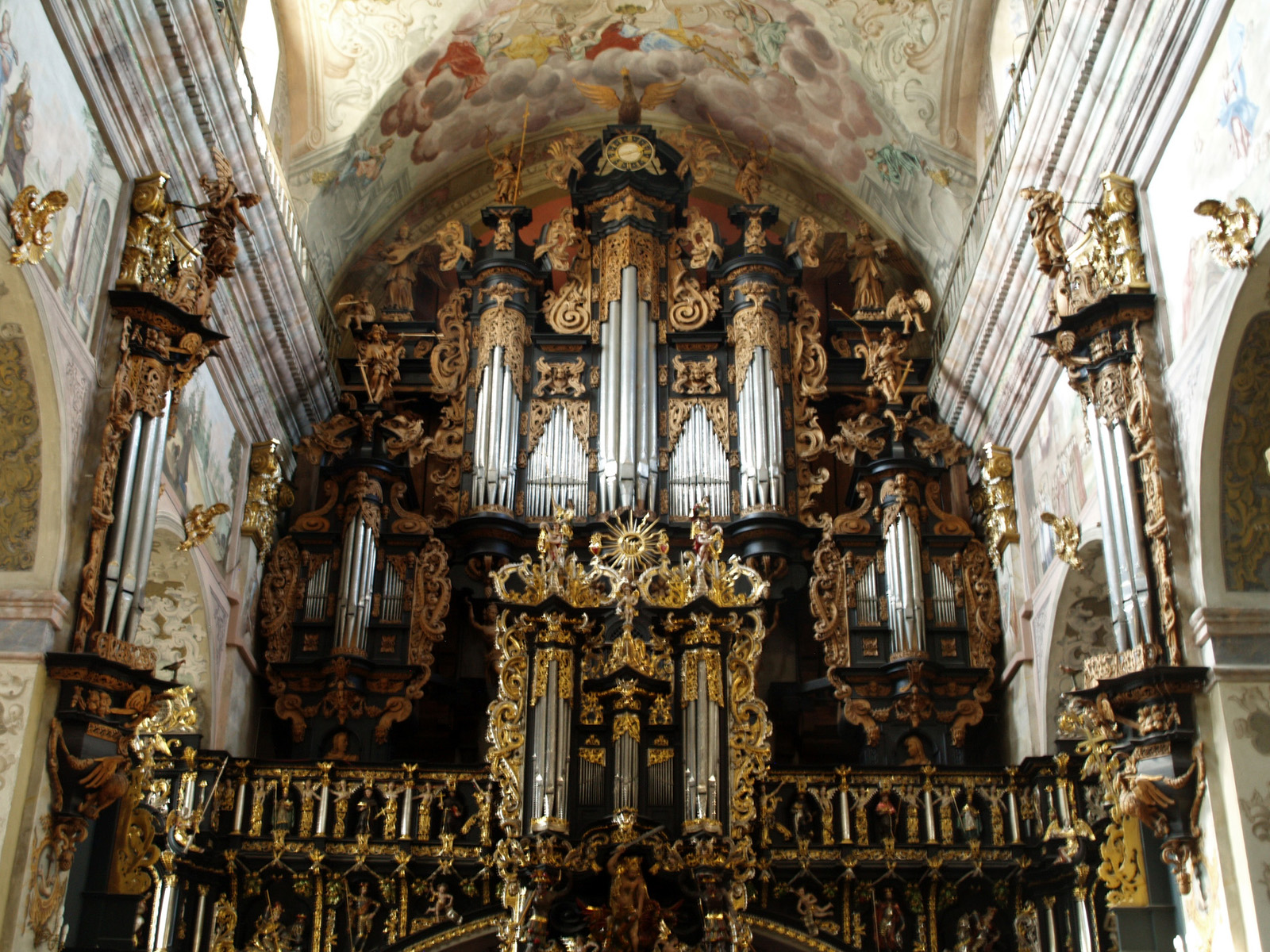
St. Mary Basilica, Leżajsk

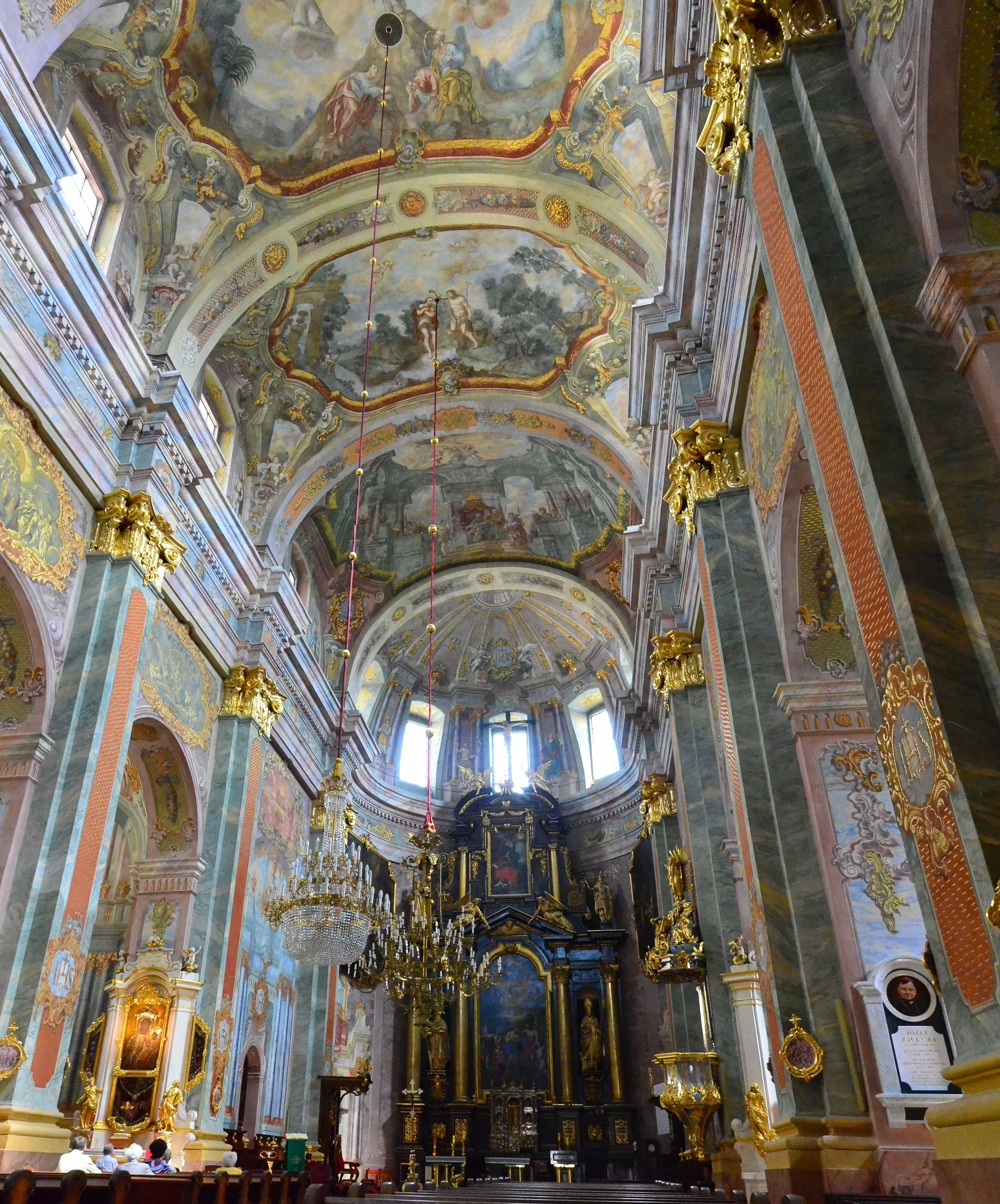
St. John the Baptist Cathedral, Lublin

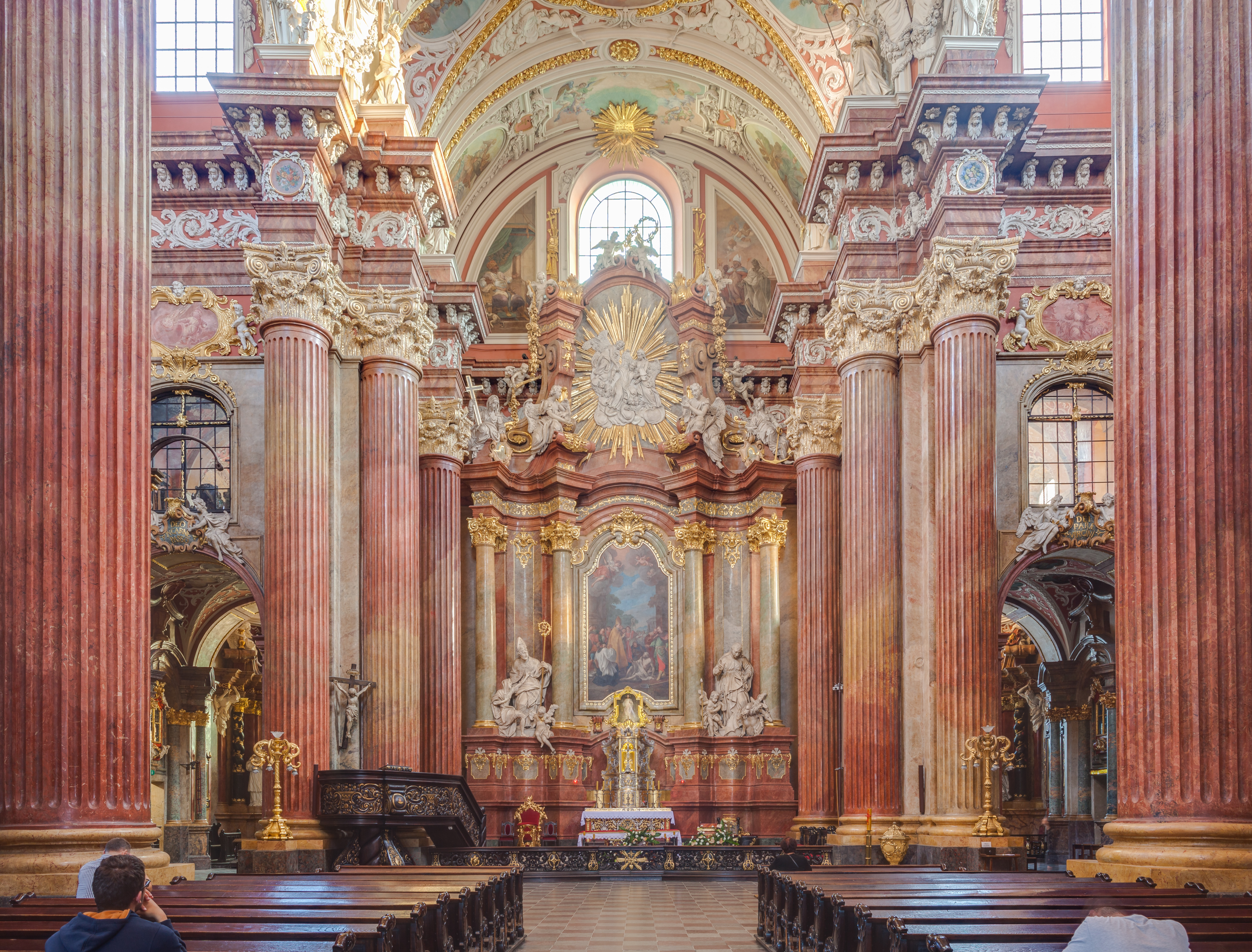
Basilica of Our Lady of Perpetual Help, Poznań

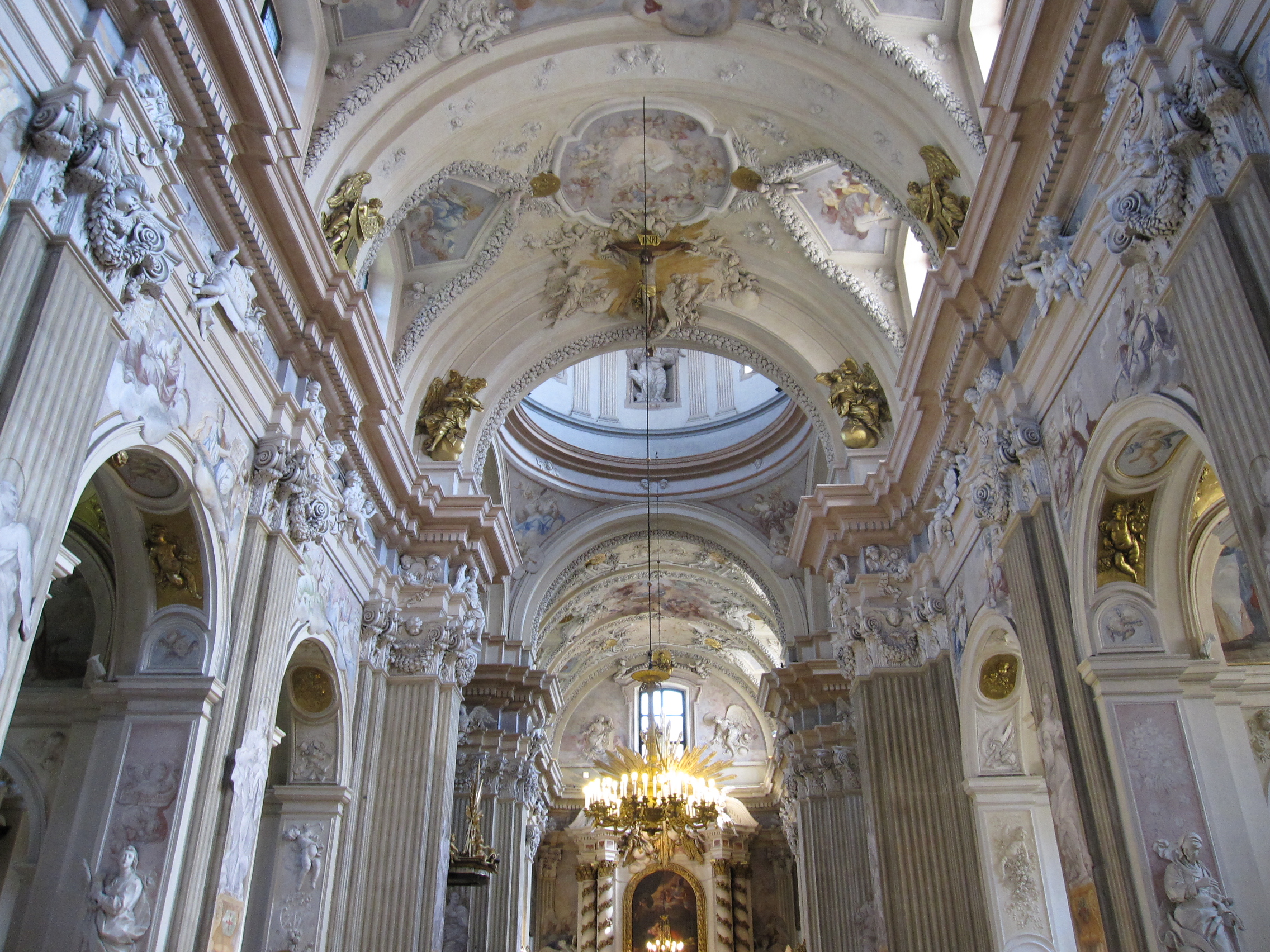
St. Anne church, Kraków

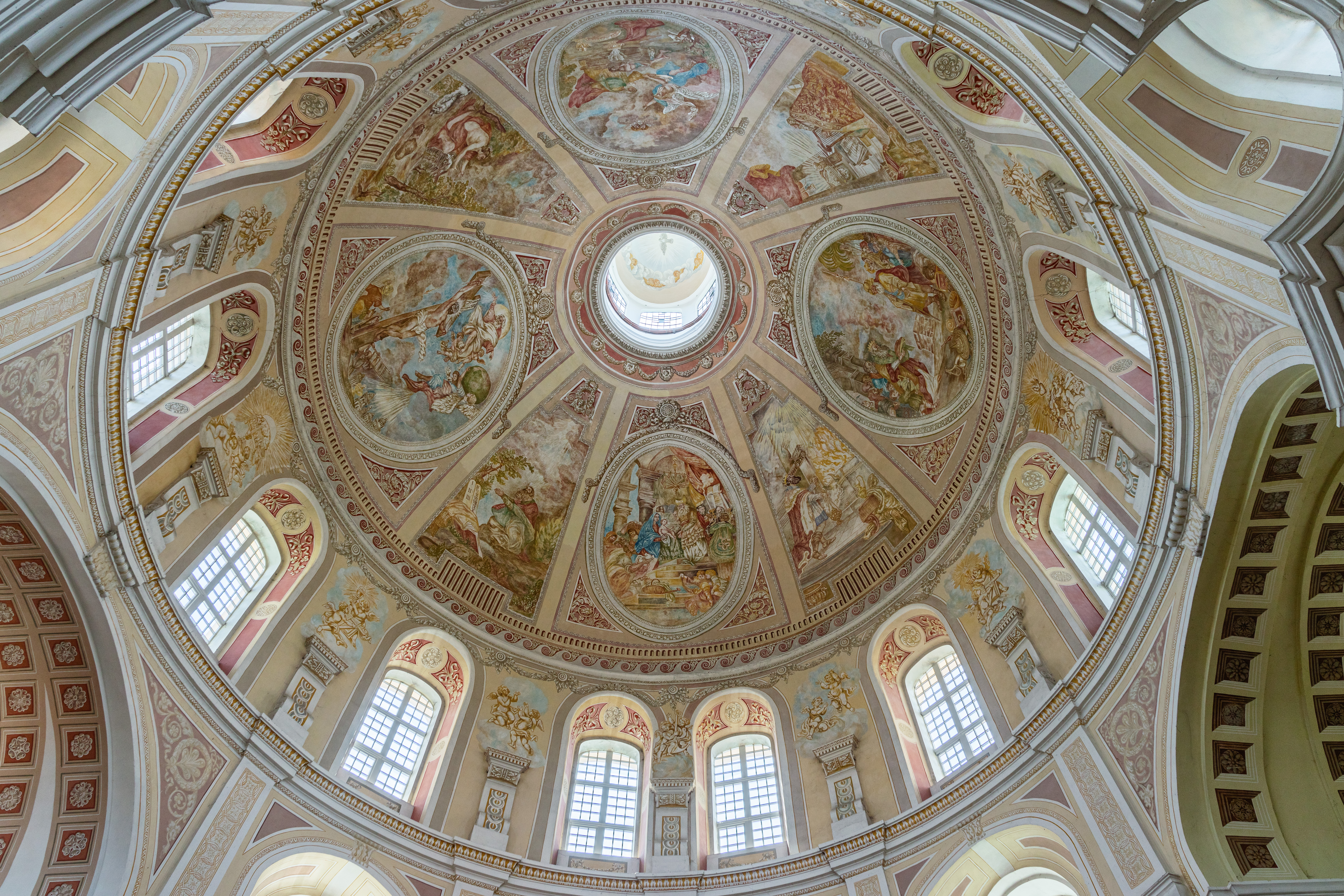
Basilica, Trzemeszno
Synagogues

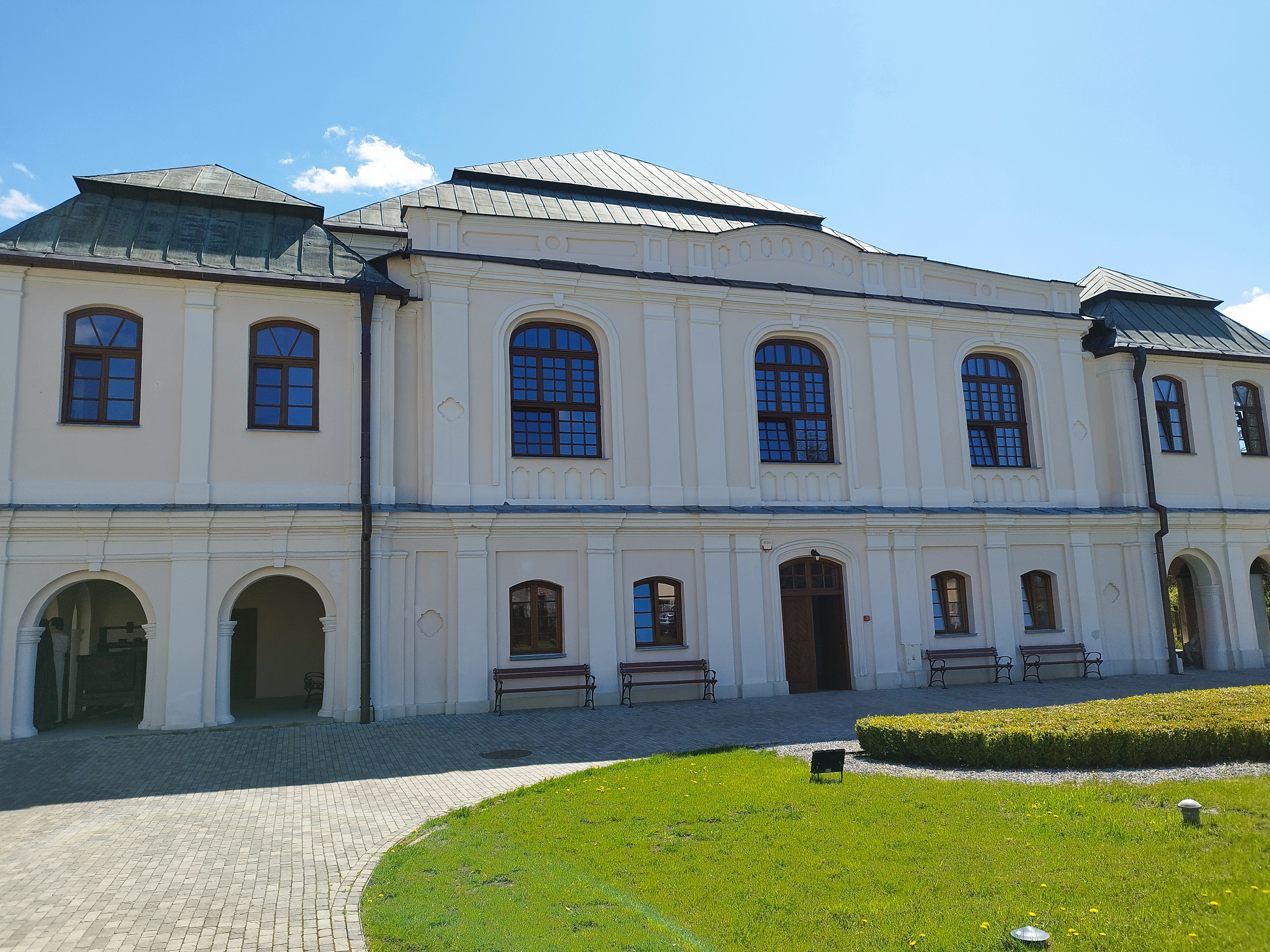
Włodawa

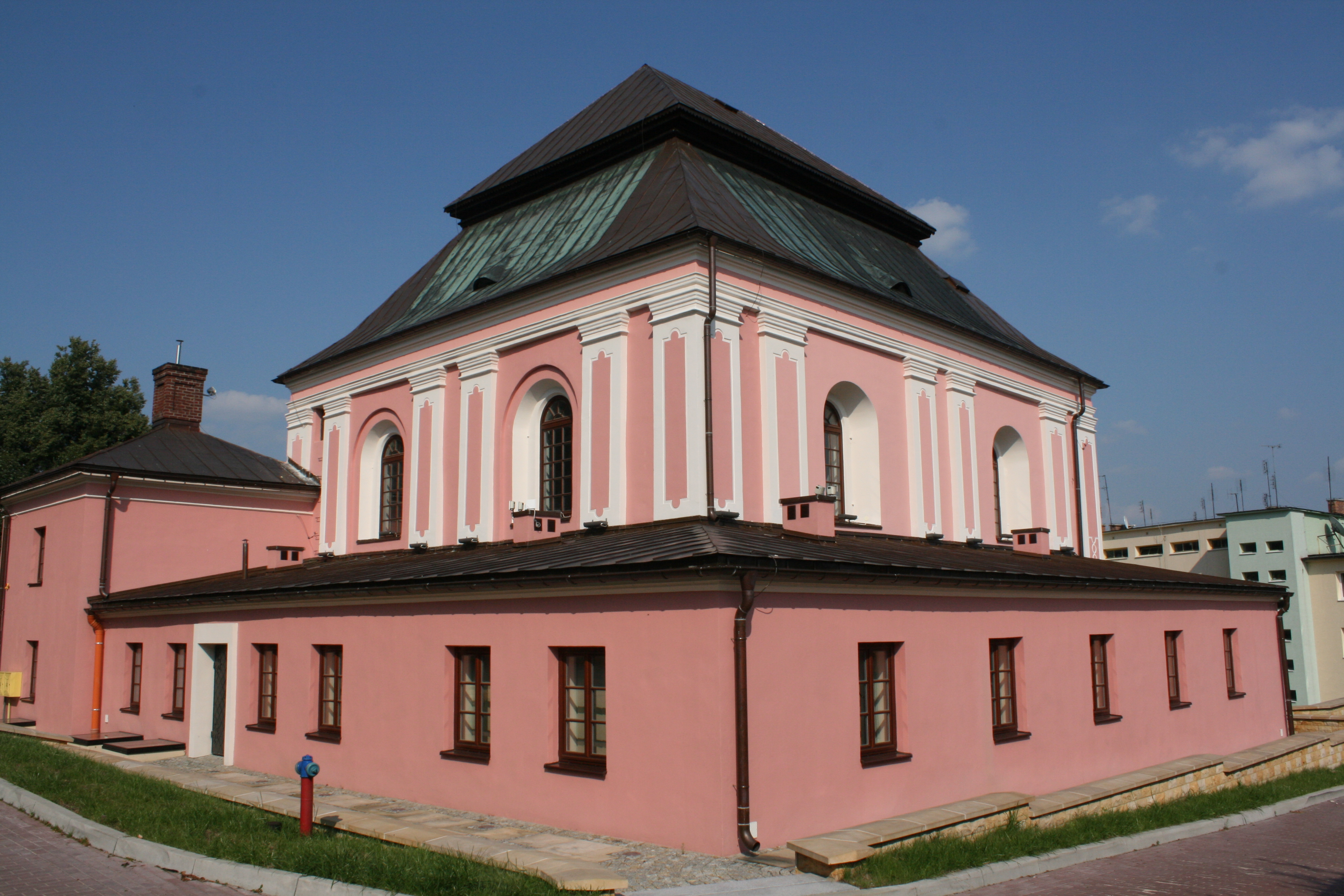
Szczebrzeszyn

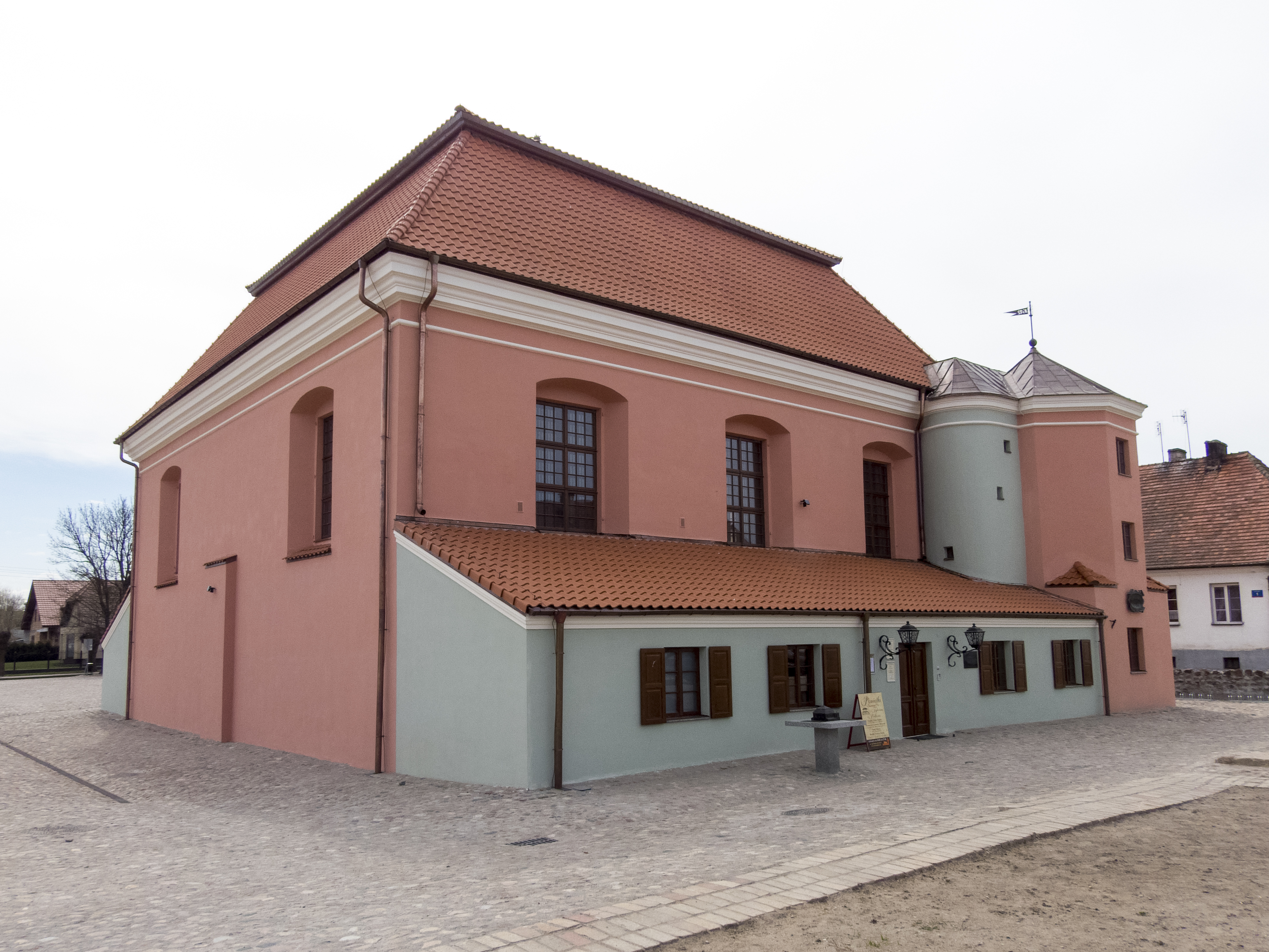
Tykocin

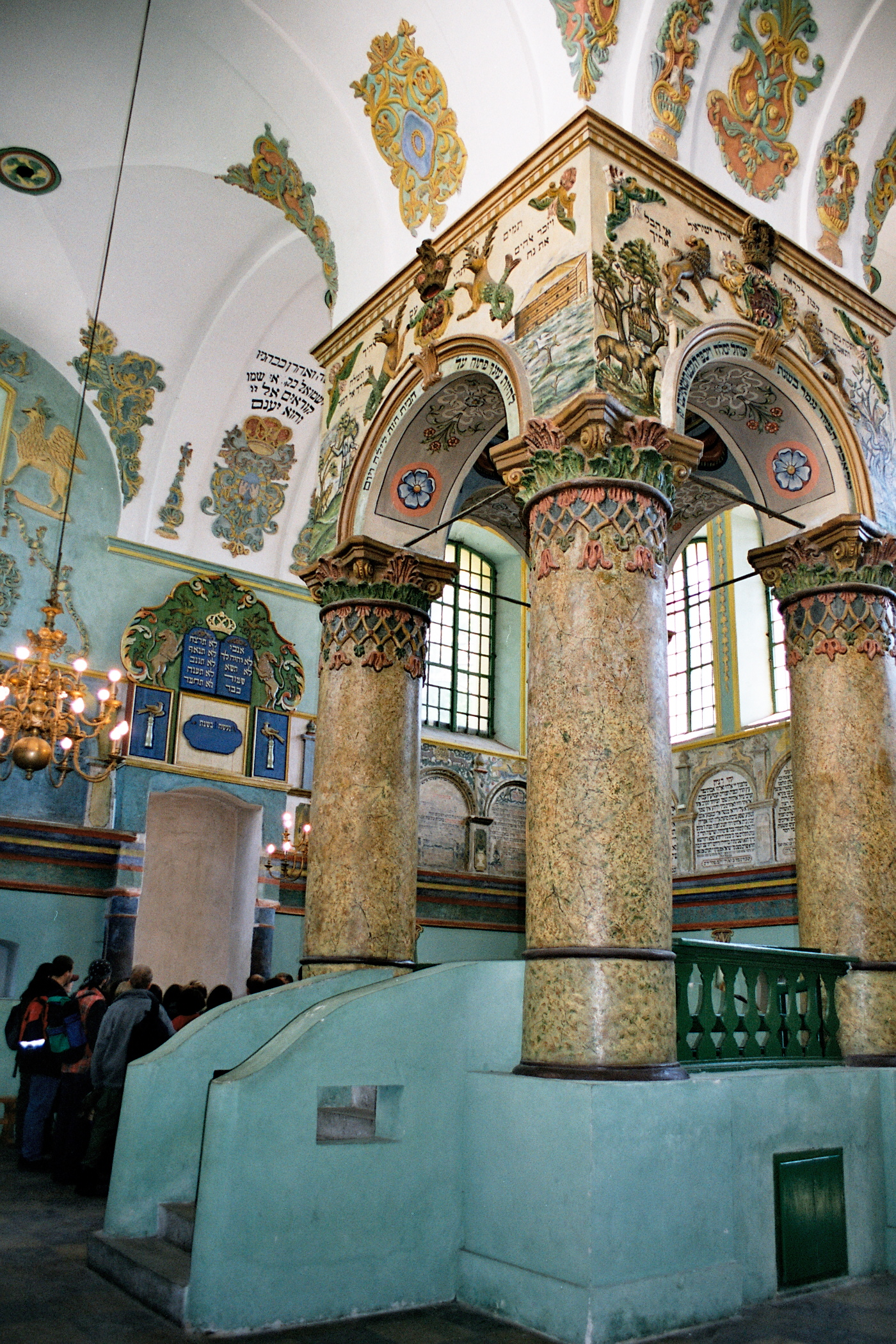
Łańcut

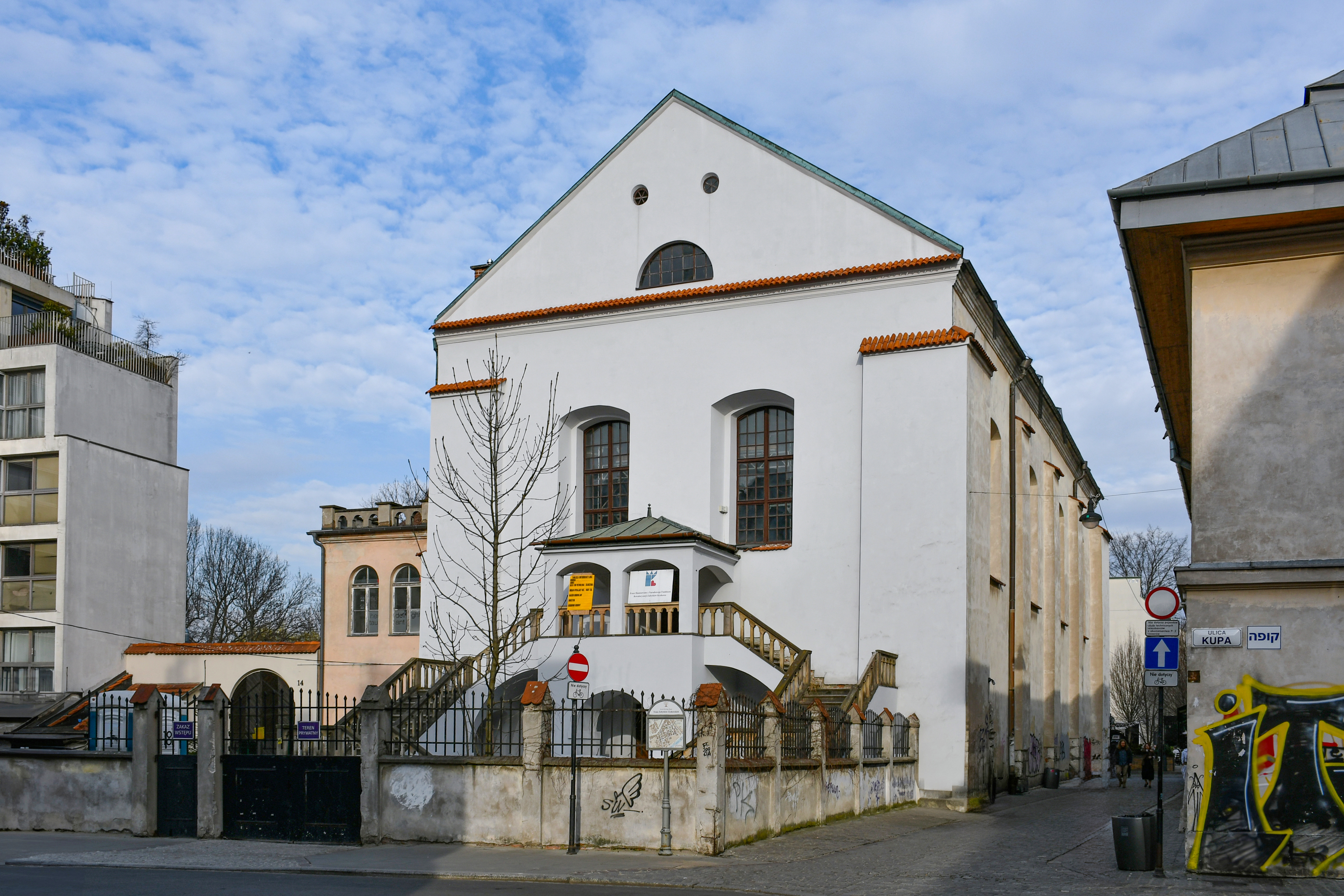
Izaak Synagogue, Kraków
Other structures

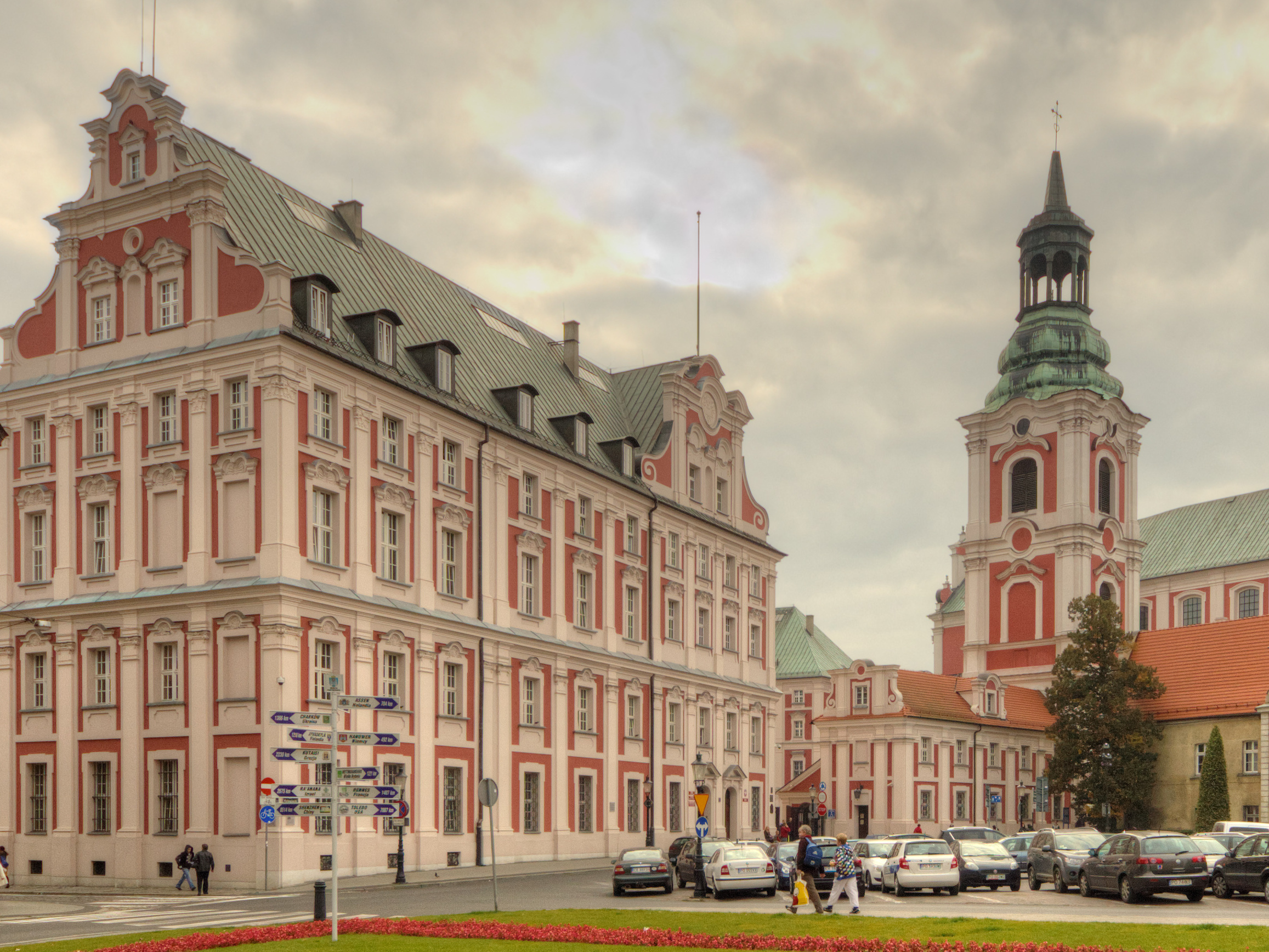
Jesuit College in Poznań

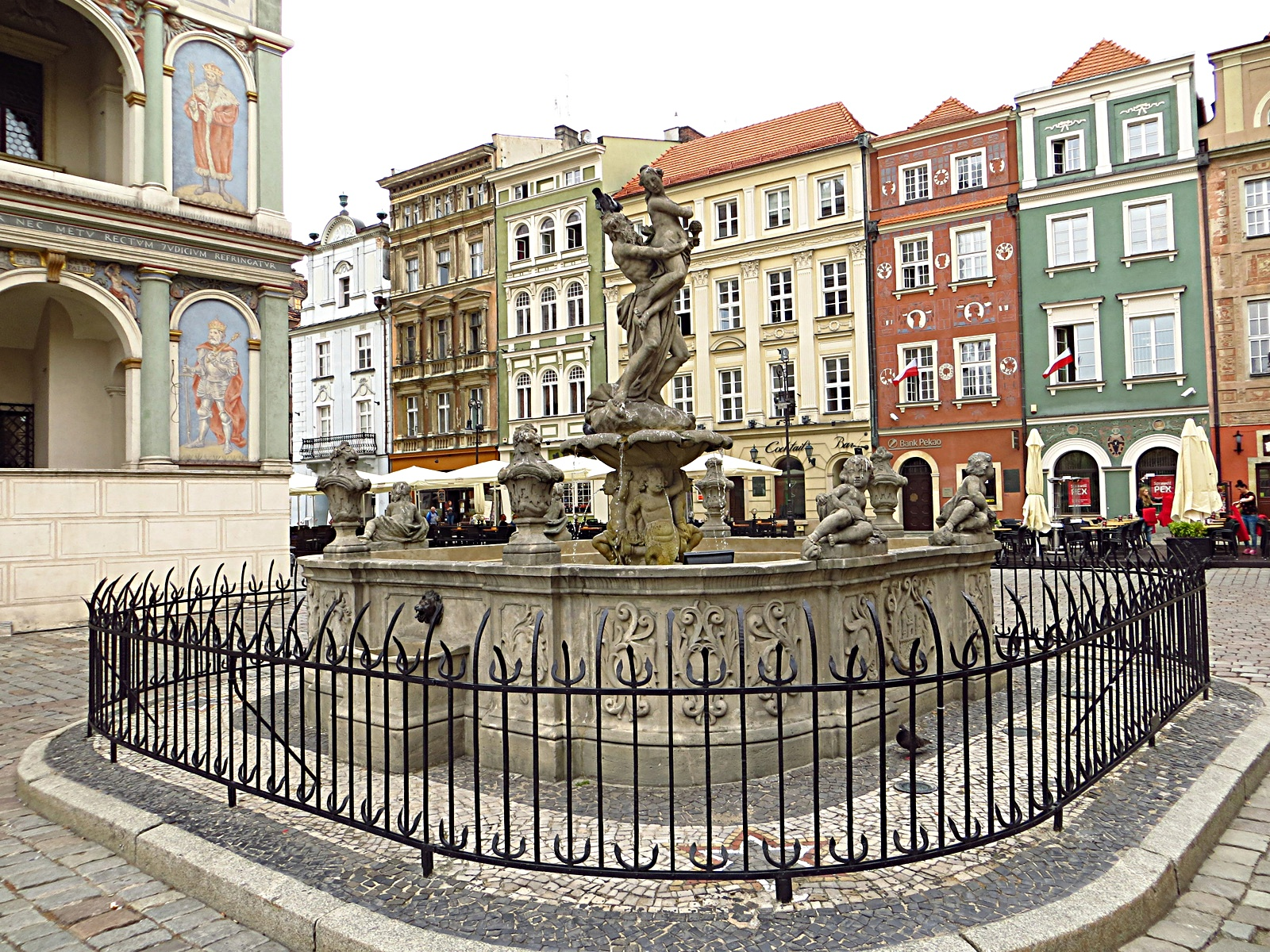
Proserpina Fountain, Poznań

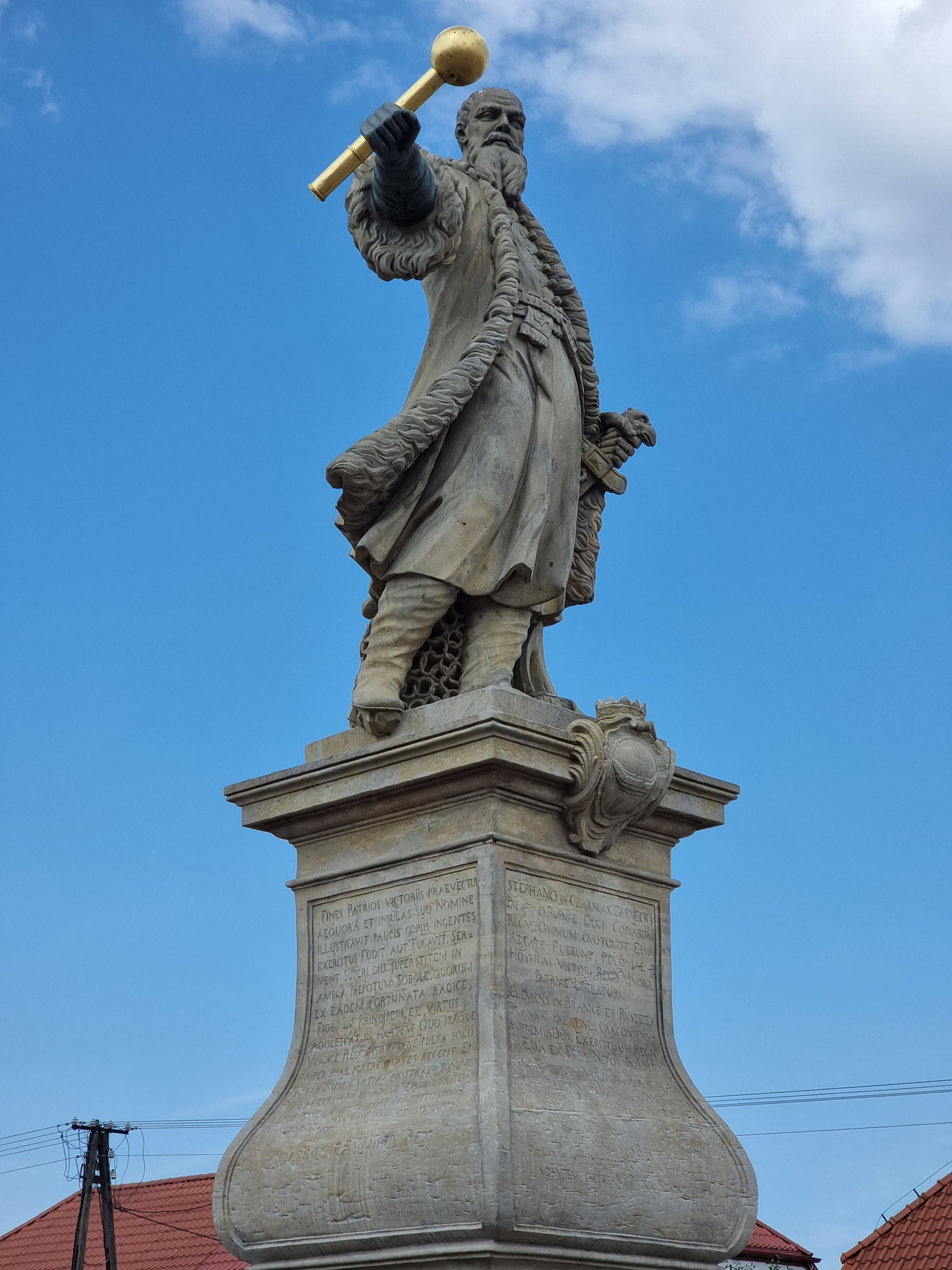
Stefan Czarniecki Monument, Tykocin

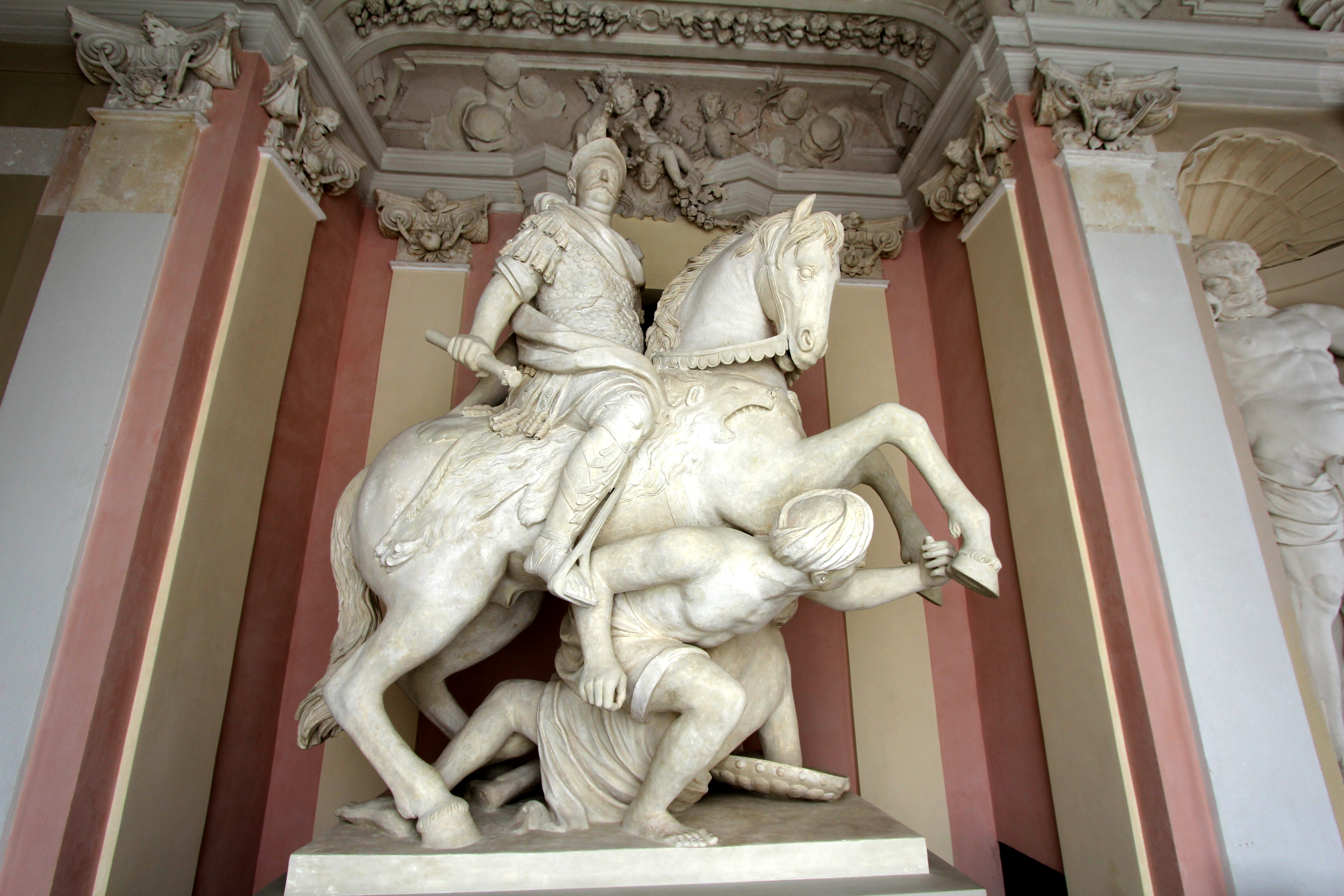
Statue of King John III Sobieski, Wilanów Palace, Warsaw

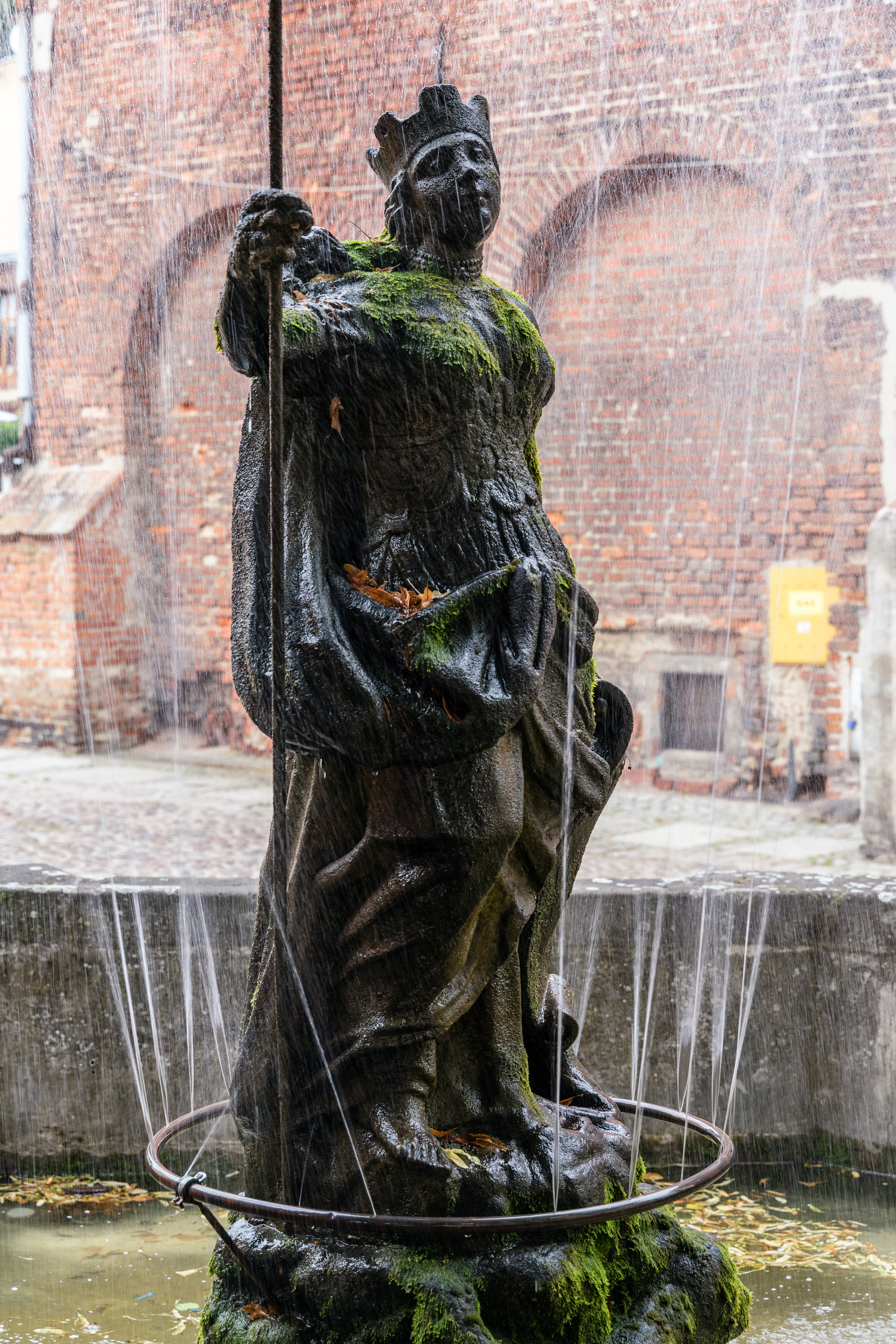
Fountain, Wschowa
