= Church of St. Casimir, Vilnius =

Church of St. Casimir
- Šv. Kazimiero bažnyčia (Lithuanian)
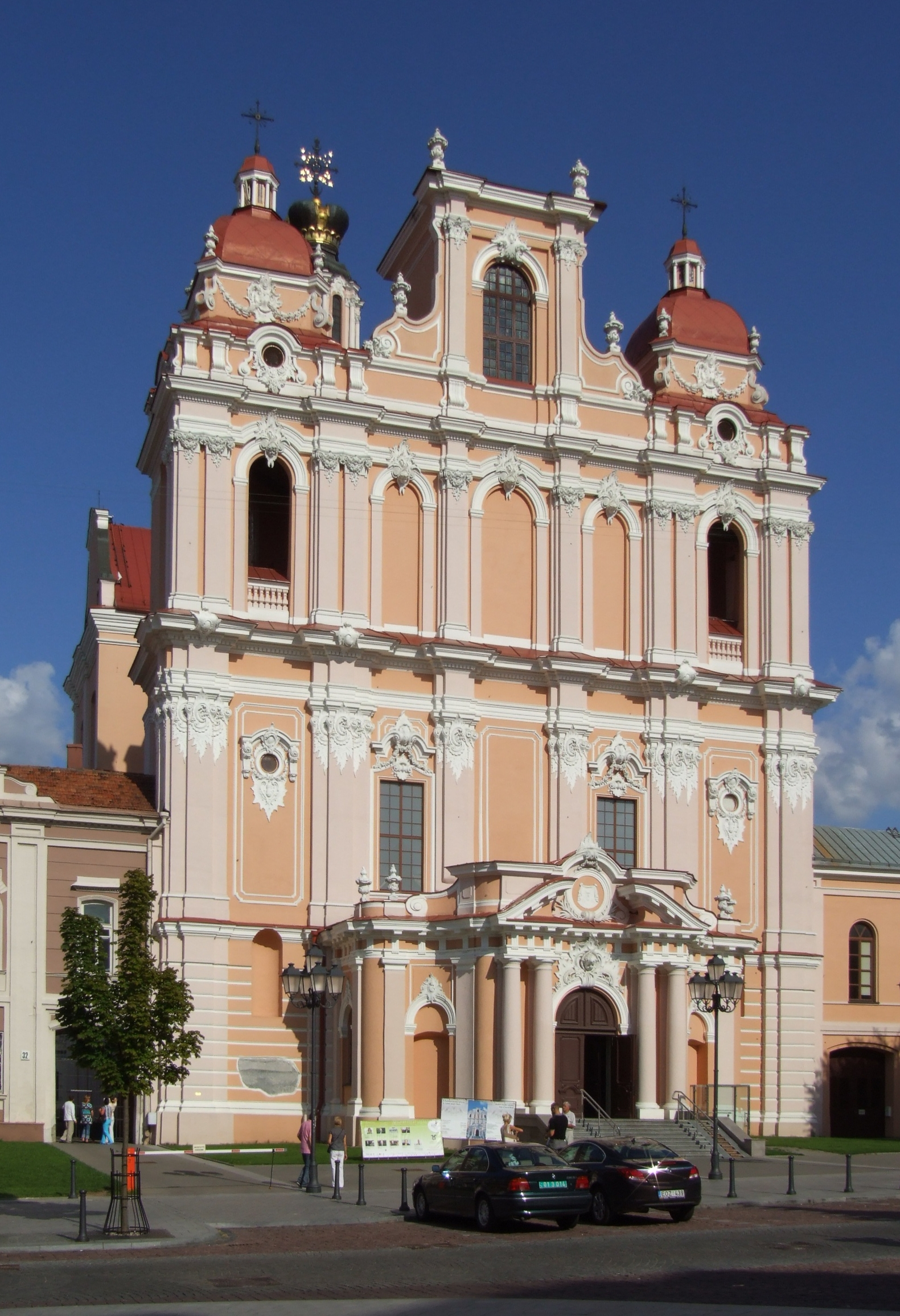
- The church's main façade from Didžioji Street
- Click on the map for a fullscreen view
- 54°40′39.50″N 25°17′19.55″E
- Location: Vilnius
- Address: Didžioji St. 34
- Country: Lithuania
- Denomination: Catholic
- Tradition: Latin Church
- Religious order: Society of Jesus
- Website: www.kazimiero.lt

History
- Founder: Sigismund III Vasa
- Dedication: Saint Casimir
- Consecrated: 1635

Architecture
- Functional status: Active
- Architect(s): The first built project (1604–1618): Jan Frankiewicz or Paweł Boksza; Mid-18th century reconstruction project: Thomas Zebrowski; Orthodox style reconstruction project (1864–1868): Nikolai Chagin, Tomasz Tyszecki; Cupola reconstruction project (1942): Jonas Mulokas
- Architectural type: Church
- Style: Baroque, Rococo, Baroque Revival
- Years built: 1604–1618
- Groundbreaking: 12 May 1604

Specifications
- Height: 55.6 metres (182 ft)
- Materials: Plastered masonry, faux marble, gold, stucco, metals

Administration
- Archdiocese: Archdiocese of Vilnius

UNESCO World Heritage Site
- Official name: Vilnius Old Town
- Type: Cultural
- Criteria: Cultural: (ii), (iv)
- Designated: 1994
- Reference no.: 541
- UNESCO region: Europe

The Church of St. Casimir (Lithuanian: Šv. Kazimiero bažnyčia) (Note: in other languages also known as: Latin: Ecclesia Sancti Casimiri, Ukrainian: Костел святого Казимира, Polish: Kościół Św. Kazimierza, Belarusian: Касцёл Святога Казіміра, Russian: Костёл Святого Казимира.) is a Roman Catholic church on the Didžioji Street in the Old Town of Vilnius, Lithuania, close to the Vilnius Town Hall. Its construction was completed in 1618 and it is the first Baroque church in Vilnius and one of the earliest Baroque architecture examples in the former territory of the Grand Duchy of Lithuania. It is the oldest preserved church dedicated to Saint Casimir. (Note: The Church of St. Casimir in Žemaitkiemis was the first church dedicated to St. Casimir, which was founded in 1586 by Garcia Alabiano, Rector of Jesuit Academy of Vilnius, and completed in 1586, but this wooden church was not preserved.) Moreover, it is the largest Baroque style building in Vilnius.

== History ==
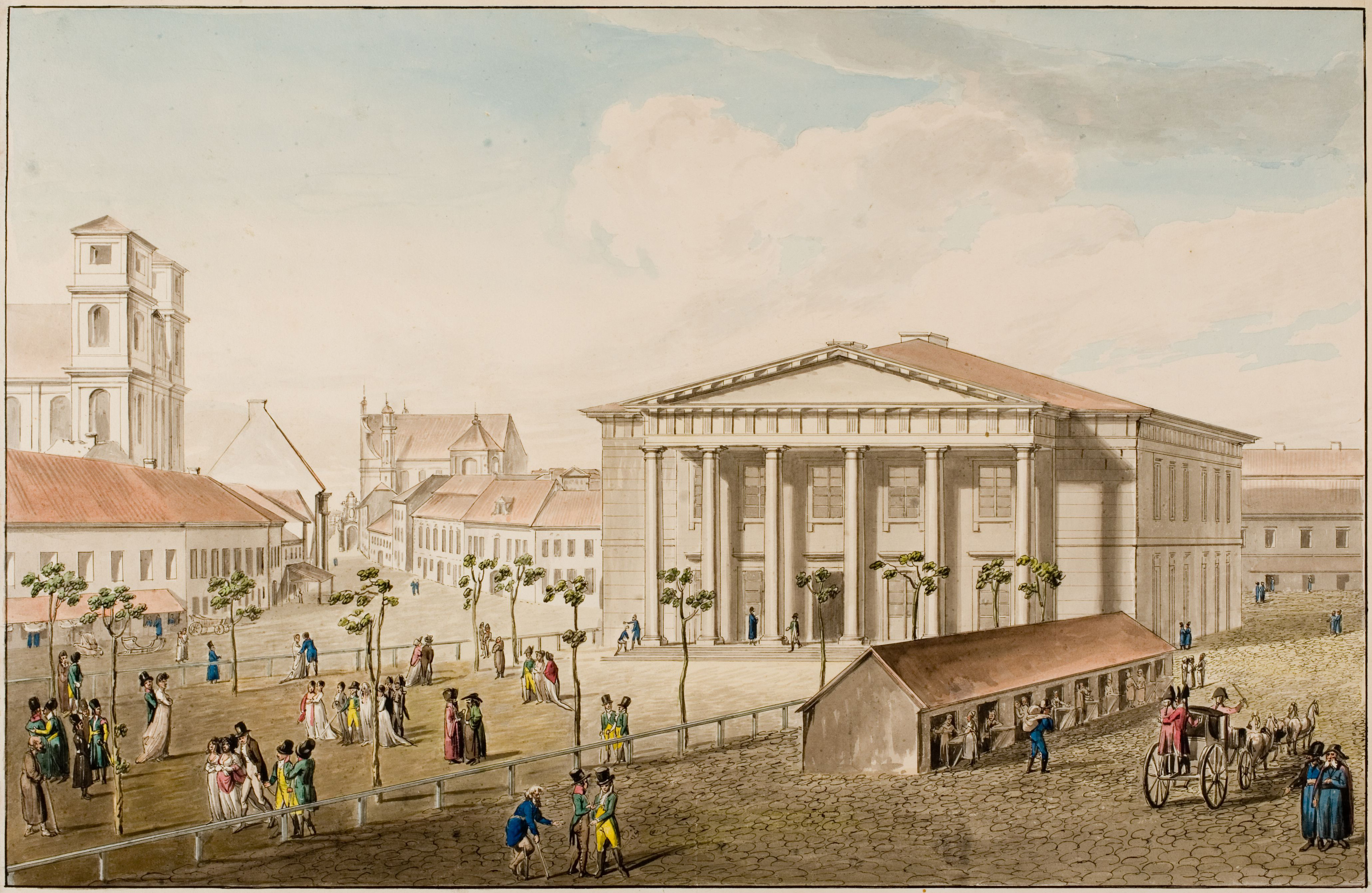
The Town Hall Square in 1797, the church is partly visible in the left side

The church in 1834, before mid-19th century Orthodox style reconstruction

The church painted in 1846

The construction of the church was initiated and financially supported by the Jagiellonian holy prince Saint Casimir's relative Sigismund III Vasa, King of Poland and Grand Duke of Lithuania, as well as was financially supported by his son, Cardinal Karol Ferdynand Vasa. The construction of the masonry church began on 12 May 1604 in memory of Saint Casimir, who was canonized on 4 March the same year. The cornerstone was consecrated by Benediktas Vaina, Bishop of Vilnius. It was built by the Jesuits and additional funding was also provided by the major Lithuanian magnates, among them Lew Sapieha, Mikołaj Krzysztof Radziwiłł the Orphan, Jan Karol Chodkiewicz, and Polish noble Aleksander Korwin Gosiewski. It is traditionally assumed that the cornerstone (which can be seen on the façade wall) was pulled into the city by procession of 700 Vilnians from the Antakalnis hills. The construction of the church was finished in 1616, and the interior design was completed in 1618. Moreover, a collegium (residence for senior monks) was built next to the church in 1615, followed later by other monastery buildings. The church was consecrated in 1635. At least in the early 18th century the interior of the church was decorated with Baroque style frescoes. In the 17th century Saint Andrew Bobola was a confessor and preacher in the church.

The Church of St. Casimir is the first Baroque church in Vilnius and one of the earliest exemplary Baroque buildings in the former territory of the Grand Duchy of Lithuania. Its spatial composition and façade were designed along the line of the famous Il Gesù church in Rome. The shape of the building was also modeled after the Baroque churches in Lublin (St. John the Baptist Cathedral) and Kraków (Church of Saints Apostles Peter and Paul), with additional towers, and the Corpus Christi Church in Nyasvizh. The author of the church's first built project was Jesuit architect Jan Frankiewicz, a pupil of architect Giovanni Maria Bernardoni, or Jesuit clergyman Paweł Boksza.

Despite providing financial support for the construction of the church, the royal court of Sigismund III Vasa sought to limit its importance as a centre of the cult of St. Casimir, in favor of the Chapel of Saint Casimir built at the Vilnius Cathedral within the Vilnius Castle Complex. During the 40-hour ceremony of the translation of the saint's relics in 1636, the Church of St. Casimir was bypassed by the procession.

The church and nearby monastery were damaged during the Russian invasion of Vilnius in 1655, but were later restored.

In the middle of the 18th century the church and nearby monastery were reconstructed by Jesuit architect Thomas Zebrowski. Under his supervision a stepped lantern cupola with a stylized Cap of Gediminas was erected. This large and impressive cupola is unique in the entire former territory of the Grand Duchy of Lithuania. Additionally, the ornate Baroque style High Altar, which was designed by Zebrowski with sculptures created by Jonas Kerneris, was constructed in the church before 1755. Moreover, in the second half of the 18th century the church's main façade and cupola were decorated with frescoes by Jesuit painter Frydrichas Juozapas Obstas, additional frescoes depicting scenes from the life of St. Casimir were also painted in the church's interior.

The church in 1872–1875, following the Orthodox style reconstruction

During the French invasion of Russia in 1812 soldiers of the Grande Armée converted the church to a grains warehouse and destroyed its altars, benches, confessionals. Following the Russian Empire's reoccupation of Vilnius in 1812 and suppression of the anti-Russian 1830–1831 uprising, the Catholic clergymen were expelled from the Church of St. Casimir and it stood abandoned for a while until the church was converted to a Russian Orthodox church in 1841. Furthermore, the church was reconstructed in 1864–1868 under the guidance of architect Tomasz Tyszecki based on the design of architect Nikolai Chagin, which suited the Eastern Orthodox church architecture principles. Following its conversion to an Orthodox church, it was renamed after Saint Nicholas and became a cathedral.

During the First World War the Imperial German Army occupied Vilnius in 1915 and the church was converted to the Evangelical Lutheran prayer house of the Vilnius Garrison, however through the efforts of Mukermann, a Jesuit Catholic chaplain in the Imperial German Army, the church was returned to the Catholics in 1917. Following the Germans defeat by the Russians in the Battle of Vilnius in 1915, priest Mukermann stayed in Vilnius. Following the Battle of Vilnius in January 1919, in March 1919 the faithful defended priest Mukermann inside the church against the Bolsheviks, who sought to arrest him, but on the third day of this defense soldiers of the Red Army burst into the sanctuary, tore him away from the Catholics protecting him, and took him out of Vilnius. Following the driving out of Bolsheviks from Vilnius, the church was returned to the Catholics in 1919 by Jurgis Matulaitis-Matulevičius, Bishop of Vilnius.

Following the Żeligowski's Mutiny and subsequent annexation of Vilnius by Poland in 1922, the church was given to Polish Jesuits and in 1925 was renovated according to a project by architect Jan Borowski.

The Catholic church in 2019

The church of St. Casimir was damaged again during the Second World War. In 1942, the reconstruction of the church's cupola with a stylized Cap of Gediminas was designed by Jonas Mulokas and its cross was designed by Vytautas Landsbergis-Žemkalnis (the authentic 18th century cross of the cupola did not survive). In 1944, the church's main façade and towers were damaged by fire.

Following the end of the Second World War, the church was initially given to Lithuanian Jesuits, but in 1949 the church was seized, closed down and converted to a wine warehouse, which resulted in destruction of its interior equipment, while later in 1963 the church was converted to a Museum of Atheism with an exposition according to the Soviet state atheism policies. The church was returned to the faithful in October 1988, reconsecrated on March 3, 1991 by Julijonas Steponavičius, Metropolitan Archbishop of Vilnius, and since then the Jesuits continues to hold church services in the church.

The church is known for excellent acoustics and organ concerts with renowned international musicians.

== Architecture ==
=== Exterior ===
The Church's rear façade and Jesuit Monastery buildings nearby

The cupola with a stylized Cap of Gediminas

The Church of St. Casimir in Vilnius is the oldest Baroque church in Vilnius. Its 17th century exterior was modeled after the Jesuit Church of the Gesù in Rome, however, unlike the Church of the Gesù, it features two towers on its main façade. The shape of the building was also modeled after the earlier towerless Baroque churches projects in Nyasvizh (Corpus Christi Church) and Kraków (Church of Saints Apostles Peter and Paul), as well as Lublin's St. John the Baptist Cathedral. Nevertheless, the design of the Church of St. Casimir is unique as it incorporates two square towers and a large cupola over transept – a configuration uncharacteristic of the Italian Jesuit churches built at that time. Moreover, it is the largest Baroque style building in Vilnius and an important landmark of the skyline of Vilnius Old Town.

This church marks the beginning of the Early Baroque in Lithuanian architecture, yet its structure also retains traces of earlier eras. Gothic elements are found in the building's foundations and cellars, while the façade displays distinct Late Renaissance features characteristic of a transitional period.

The building is a three-aisled, twin-towered basilica with a Latin cross plan. Its volumetric composition is characterized by monumentality: the central nave is significantly higher than the side naves, and at their intersection rises a majestic cupola, which is 55 metres in height and 17 metres in diameter, topped by the stylized Cap of Gediminas. The stylized Cap of Gediminas, which has a diameter of nearly 6 metres, is clad in gilded sheet metal interspersed with sections of copper sheeting. The cupola of the church was originally erected in the mid-18th century according to a project of architect Thomas Zebrowski, later the stylized Cap of Gediminas was restored in 1942 based on a design by Jonas Mulokas. The Christian cross atop the sphere of the stylized Cap of Gediminas was forged in 1942 by blacksmiths from Vilnius, based on a design by Vytautas Landsbergis-Žemkalnis.

Entablatures divide the main façade into three tiers of varying heights. These are articulated vertically by pilasters, windows and niches with semicircular arches, as well as rectangular and circular openings. The circular windows are surrounded by shell motifs and other Neo-Baroque decorative moldings. Above the third tier, there is an ornate attic and two low side towers.

The side façades of the church are articulated vertically by buttresses, pilasters, and windows with semicircular arches, while horizontal lines are defined by cornices. The rear façade features a pediment with a wavy, notched silhouette.

According to architect Nikolai Chagin's reconstruction project, in the mid-19th century a porch with an ornate portal has been added to the front of the church and it contains the main entrance to the church. During this reconstruction in the main façade two old towers were lowered and a pediment was replaced with a third tower in the main façade's middle. Moreover, stucco decorative elements were added to the main façade and vases were placed on the corners of the porch and the towers. Additionally, all three towers of the main façade, cupola, and porch were topped with Eastern Orthodox church architecture style onion domes, however the onion domes were removed during later renovations once the church was returned to the Catholics and similar to initial tops were installed on two side towers. Furthermore, at the time of this reconstruction frescoes of Saint Joseph, Saint Nicholas, and Saint Alexander Nevsky were painted on the main façade, but these frescoes were later painted over. This reconstruction gave the church Baroque Revival features.

=== Interior ===
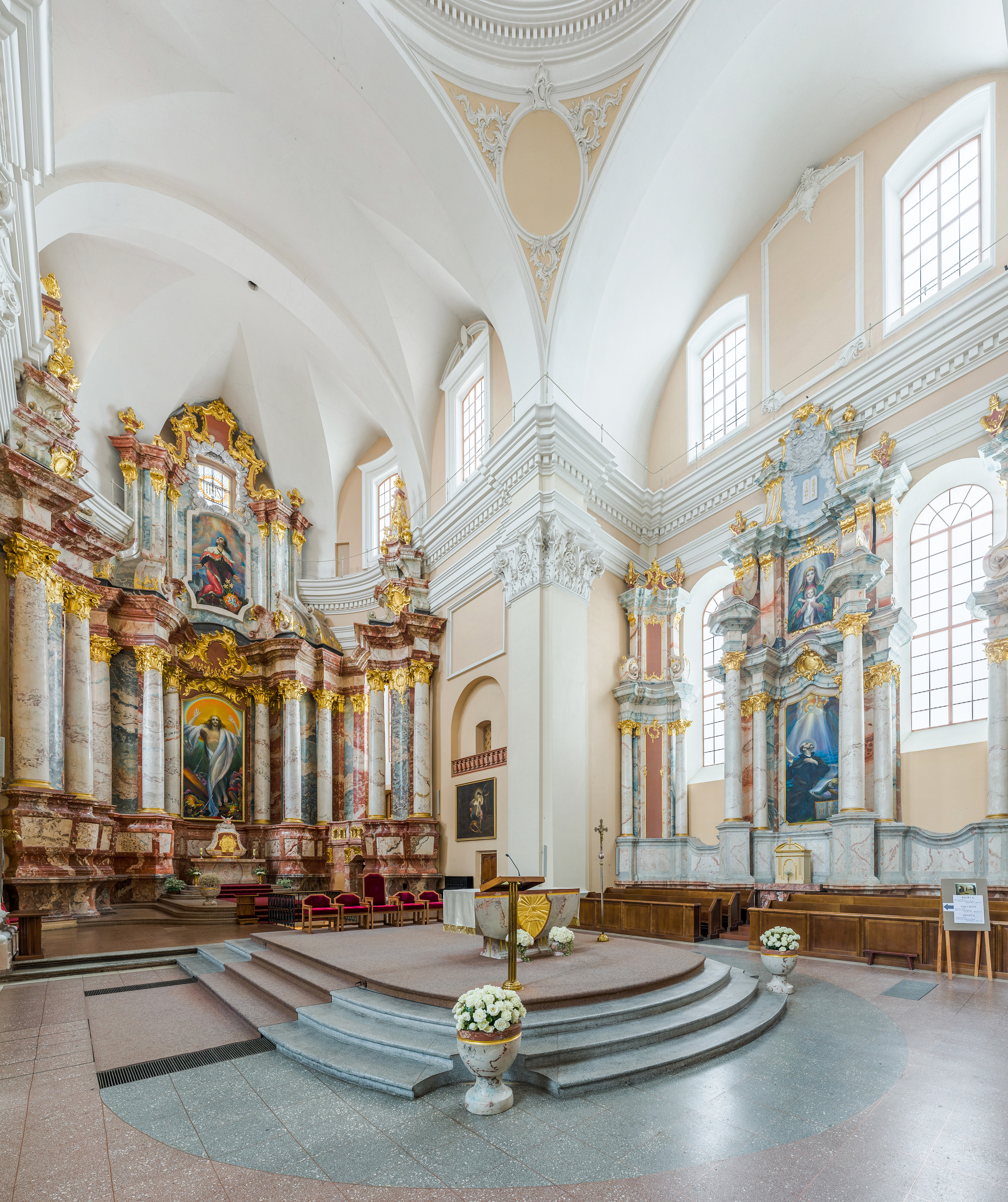
The High Altar and side altar of Saint Ignatius of Loyola

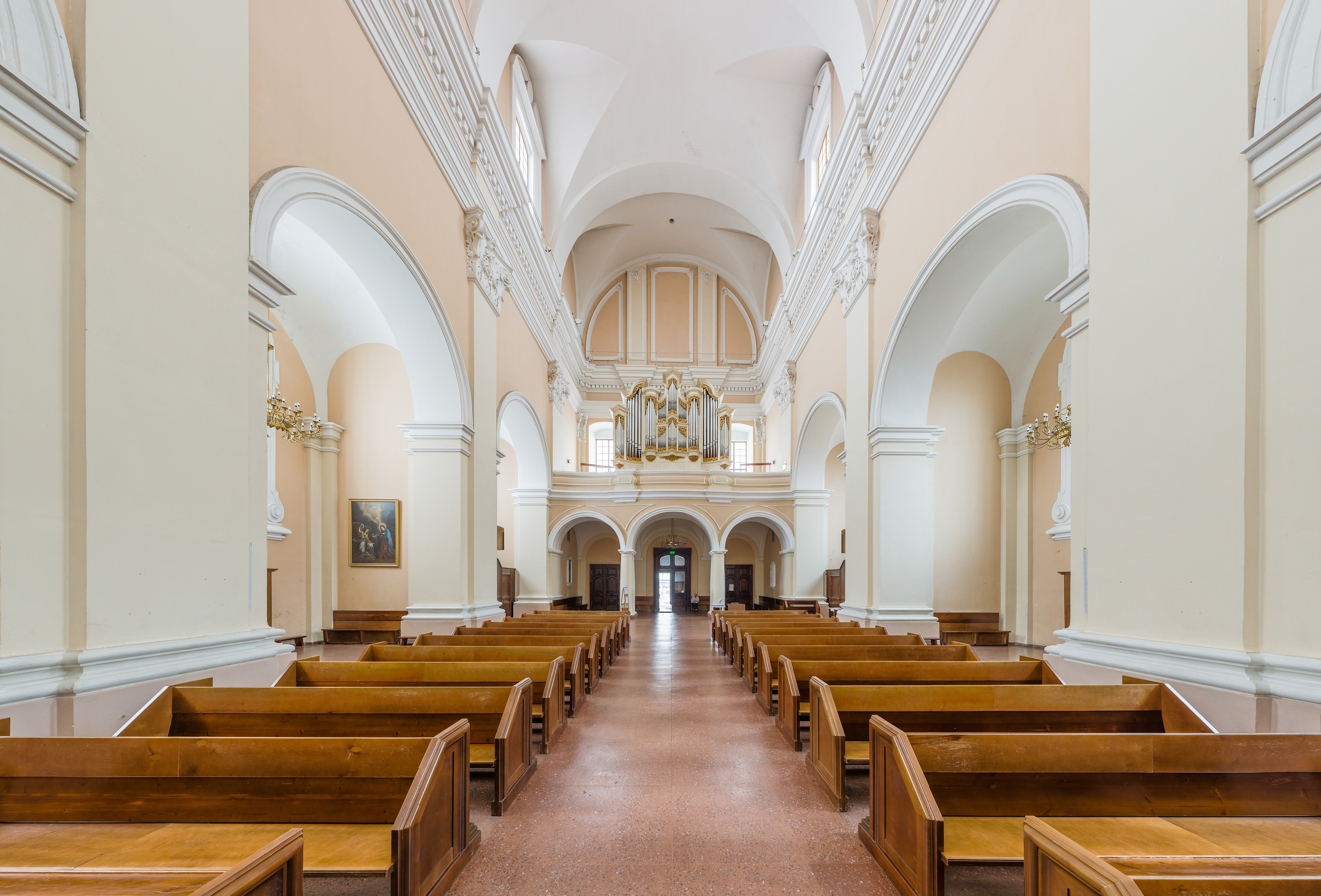
The interior viewed towards organ

The cupola's interior with stucco moldings and uncovered frescoes fragments

The church's organ and a choir singing in front of it in the choir loft

The church's central nave, compared to other churches in Vilnius, is exceptionally wide and tall, terminating in a semicircular apse, while the side naves have been designed into six chapels that are not interconnected and create an intimate space for prayers. The interior is dominated by light, pastel tones, complemented by sculptural stucco ornamentation, created in the mid-18th century by architect Thomas Zebrowski, and sumptuous faux marble details, which lend a sense of visual lightness to the church's spaces. The church's interior was previously richly decorated with frescoes depicting the life of Saint Casimir, especially during the Zebrowski's mid-18th century reconstruction. However, during its conversion to an Orthodox church in the mid-19th century destructive measures were taken to its Catholic Baroque interior. Polychrome researches conducted in the church's interior in the 1930s, 1978, and 2020 discovered only some poor condition frescoes from the pre-mid-19th century reconstruction period. According to 1978 research reports, the mid-18th century frescoes above the central nave arcade depicting the life of Saint Casimir, which were uncovered in the 1930s, were not preserved.

The main features of the interior are three monumental Late Baroque altars decorated with faux marble. The central High Altar and side altars are framed by massive columns with ornate, gilded Corinthian capitals that support entablatures and decorative gilded peaks. Historically, the High Altar was adorned with seven Rococo style white sculptures of figures associated with the Jagiellonian dynasty, including Saint Casimir, created in 1754, while the side altars were adorned with smaller Rococo style white sculptures of Jesuit Saints, created in 1754–1768, however following the church's closure in 1862 these sculptures were integrated to the exterior of Vilnius Cathedral and remain in its southern and northern sides niches.

The High Altar serves as the church's primary artistic and sacred focal point. It was designed in the mid-18th century by the architect Thomas Zebrowski. The High Altar features Late Baroque forms, characterized by their dynamism, extensive use of gilding, and a finish of faux marble (stucco) that mimics reddish and greenish stone. It is structured into three sections and three tiers. The altar is divided into these three sections by windows. Aligned with these windows, on the first tier, which rests on the curved pedestals, are small, integrated loggias. The second tier is dominated by columns arranged across various planes, their Corinthian capitals are adorned with Rococo ornamentation. The central section of the High Altar houses a painting The Risen Christ (by the artist Antanas Kmieliauskas), which replaced earlier artworks following the return of the church to the faithful in 1988 and subsequent restoration of the interior. Above it hangs a slightly smaller painting depicting Saint Casimir with the Coat of arms of Lithuania and the Cap of Gediminas at his feet, symbolizing his renunciation of earthly authority, while in the background are depicted other churches of Vilnius, as well as the Three Crosses Monument. The upper portion of the High Altar has preserved authentic Baroque elements depicting angels and saints. The composition of the High Altar visually ascends, reaching toward the vaults above it. Beneath the High Altar lies a burial crypt dating back to the first half of the 17th century.

The presbytery area in front of the High Altar is elevated, with flooring of light-colored stone that contrasts with the colorful faux marble of the High Altar. At the foot of the High Altar stands an artistic tabernacle, designed to house the Eucharist, whose form and decoration echo the overall stylistic character of the church's interior. This space is reserved for the most important liturgical rites and its visibility from every part of the three-aisled church underscores the significance of the altar as a spiritual centre.

Viewed from the church's main entrance, the right side altar is dedicated to Saint Ignatius of Loyola, founder of the Jesuit Order, while the left side altar is dedicated to the missionary Saint Andrew Bobola. Both side altars feature paintings. The right altar displays paintings Saint Ignatius of Loyola and The Blessed Virgin Mary with the Child, while the left altar features paintings Saint Andrew Bobola and The Healing of the Blind Man. All of these side altars paintings were painted by Antanas Kmieliauskas. The side altars paintings are framed on either side by a pair of columns and in front of these two columns stands a third column, which is thicker and taller than those two columns behind it. At the top of the side altars are compositions incorporating volutes, shells, and cloud-like forms.

The church has excellent acoustics and its organ is installed above the main entrance to the church. This space features characteristics of the Late Baroque and Rococo styles, highlighted by the gracefully curved line of the choir loft, which is richly decorated with stucco moldings and openwork motifs. The church's current organ is one of the most valuable in Vilnius. Although the historical organ from the Jesuit era did not survive, due to fires and the closure of the church in the 19th century, a mechanical organ by the renowned German company Oberlinger Orgelbau was installed in the church in 1995–2003, thanks to the efforts of the organist Leopoldas Digrys. The musical instrument was installed in the church by the company of Laimis Pikutis. The organ features 45 stops, three manuals, a pedal keyboard, and approximately 3,200 pipes. Its sound is distinguished by both clarity and power, making this church one of the primary venues in Vilnius for religious music and organ concerts.

Furthermore, the church has two towers that house belfries. Since the mid-18th century four bells hung in the church's towers, named after Saint Casimir, Saint Joachim, Saint Francis Xavier, while the fourth historic bell name is unknown. In the Soviet period three old large bells were dismantled from the towers once it was converted to a Museum of Atheism in 1963 and their further fate is unknown. In 1996, the Germans gifted a new bell to the church, which was cast in 1921 and weighs 500 kg. The bell originally belonged to a church in the German state of Bavaria, however that church was destroyed during the Second World War and the bell was subsequently brought to Berlin. It is equipped with an automatic clock mechanism and is named after Saint Norbert of Xanten. The bells installed in the towers are an essential part of the church complex, used for liturgical rites and to announce celebrations. They are suspended from massive metal structures that allow for safe movement during ringing. While the modern system is generally automated, it retains the traditional mechanical principle wherein the clapper strikes the inner wall of the bell.

In 1997, an installation by Vladimir Tarasov titled A Little Bell for St. Casimir was installed in the church bell towers. It consists of two circular arrangements of pipes, each comprising 15 distinct tones. Positioned between them is a disc equipped with a sail. A wooden, sun-shaped structure serves as the framework for this percussion instrument, while wires and chains attached to its wooden spokes hold the metal pipes (or tubular bells) suspended above. As the wind blows, the disc strikes the pipes, producing varying musical sounds depending on the strength of the wind.

==== Crypt ====
Frescoes (left) and reliquary of Saint Andrew Bobola (right) in the 17th-century crypt

In 1991, a 17th-century crypt featuring unique wall drawings was discovered beneath the High Altar. It may have previously served as a burial place for the Jesuits who lived and worked there, as well as for benefactors of the church. Frescoes preserved on the central pillars and vaults of the crypt depict the Crucifixion of Jesus, angels, and Latin inscriptions, which reflect the spiritual teachings of the Jesuits and the theme of memento mori ("remember [that you have] to die"). The frescoes are painted in shades of grey, black, and brown, while natural masonry colors dominate the background of the floors and walls, emphasizing the solemnity and sacred nature of the space. In 1995, remains of people were reburied in this crypt from other basements of the church.

In 2003, a memorial space for Saint Andrew Bobola was established in the crypt, which was discovered in 1991. The reliquary of Saint Andrew Bobola features delicate metalwork: an octagonal glass-and-metal structure adorned with floral motifs (roses), with a radiant halo at the center framing the saint's relic. Saint Andrew Bobola was a Jesuit whose life and martyrdom are closely linked to the history of the Grand Duchy of Lithuania and the Polish–Lithuanian Commonwealth as he was beaten and tortured to death during the Khmelnytsky Uprising. Bobola lived and worked for a time in Vilnius, at the Church of St. Casimir and Jesuit Monastery attached to it, therefore the return of his relics to this sanctuary after 1991 became a significant event for the community. The reliquary serves as a reminder to visitors of the Jesuits' missionary work and offers an example of Christian endurance during times of severe historical hardship.

==== Attic ====
The church's attic with masonry arches

The church's attic space reveals massive masonry arches that support the roof and ensure the building's structural stability. Constructed from antique bricks characteristic of early 17th-century building practices, these arches reflect the transitional period from Gothic to Baroque. Beyond bearing the weight of the roof, these structures also create a space above the interior vaults.

In the attic a modern metal walkway – a small bridge – has been installed. An observation platform is situated in the upper part of the church, beneath the central cupola. A metal lattice structure, featuring protective glass and metal railings, runs along the entire perimeter of the cupola. This gallery allows for safe movement within the dome without interfering with religious rituals or concerts taking place below. A special net is stretched above the gallery to ensure safety and protect the architectural decor. From this vantage point, one has a clear view of the three faux marble altars and the paintings of Antanas Kmieliauskas. The attic space is significant not only as a technical area but also as a vantage point where the church's volume and structural logic are most clearly revealed. Light, filtering in through small openings, accentuates the massiveness of the arches and creates a distinct atmosphere.

== See also ==
- List of Jesuit sites
- List of churches in Vilnius
- Catholic Church in Lithuania

== Bibliography ==
- Czyż, Anna Sylwia (2021). "O inwestycjach budowlanych Wazów w Wilnie" [On the construction investments of the House of Vasa in Vilnius] (PDF). Rocznik Lituanistyczny (in Polish). 7.
- Venclova, Tomas (2002). Vilnius. R. Paknys Publishing House. ISBN 9986-830-48-6.
