= Vėra Šleivytė =

Lithuanian photographer and artist

- Born: December 6, 1906; Antašava, Kupiškio, Russian Empire
- Died: April 21, 1998 (aged 91); Kaunas, Lithuania
- Education: Kaunas Art School, Lithuania
- Occupations: Photographer; painter; graphic artist

Veronika "Vėra" Šleivytė (1906–1998) was a Lithuanian photographer, painter, and graphic artist.

== Life ==
Veronika Šleivytė was born on 6 December 1906 in the village of Antašava, then of the Russian Empire, and now of the district of Kupiškis, in Lithuania, into a family of a total of 14 children to parents who were landless farmers. According to her siblings, their father did not want Vėra to continue her education past elementary school so that she works in the fields along with the other children, but her mother and sister Ona helped her to continue her formal education. After graduating, she enrolled at the Kaunas Art School and got a job working as a draughtswoman at the Ministry of Agriculture.

Šleivytė was openly a lesbian in her life and in her letters she declared her love openly, but her paintings and photographs spoke only in code. She often drew flowers and photographed herself with flowers, in a manner reminiscent of the 1970s' work by Robert Mapplethorpe, another "gay icon."

In 2022, a three-month, extensive retrospective of her work was exhibited at the National Museum of Art, with many originals and prints of yet unseen negatives been staged for the first time.

== Social activism ==
Šleivytė was active in the struggle of female emancipation in then-heavily patriarchal Lithuania and particularly strove for women artists' opportunities to exhibit their work. She helped stage the first amateur photography exhibition in 1933 and was one of the founders of the Women Artists’ Society, of which she was elected as its first president.

== Selected personal exhibitions ==
- 1970, exhibition pavilion in Vilnius
- 1971, Kaunas branch of the Union of Artists
- 1974, Museum of Atheism, Vilnius
- 1977, MK Čiurlionis Art Museum, Kaunas
- 1984, Museum of Local History, Kupiški
- 1986, gallery in Kaunas
- 1987, Birštonas history museum
- 1992, Kaunas State Philharmonic

== Legacy ==
Curators Milda Dainovskytė and Agnė Narušytė consider Šleivytė's photography to be of interest today both for its artistic heritage and as documenting her life roles as "a daughter, a sister, an artist, the public woman, the educator, and a lover," stating that her images of erotic relationships with women form a particularly important part of the LGBTQ+ community's history.

In 1985, the Vėra Šleivytė Gallery was established in Antašava, housed inside two residencies and six granaries. The Gallery contains some 270 paintings, graphic works, and photographs donated by the artist.

Since 2000, the Kupiškis Museum of Ethnography organizes a yearly competition of photography among schoolchildren, with the award named after Vėra Šleivytė, with funds allocated through the artist's will for "the development of young talents." For art historian Agnė Narušytė, Šleivytė was the first Lithuanian to photograph lesbian love, turning her life into a "constant performance in front of the camera." In "the sea of Šleivytė’s photography," she wrote, "there is a huge variety of objects and situations that attract her lens and her eye," with the artist being "everywhere, the creator of her own life, a participant in modern life."
