= Jesuit Church, Warsaw =

Coordinates: 52°14′56″N 21°0′47″E

Church of the Gracious Mother of God
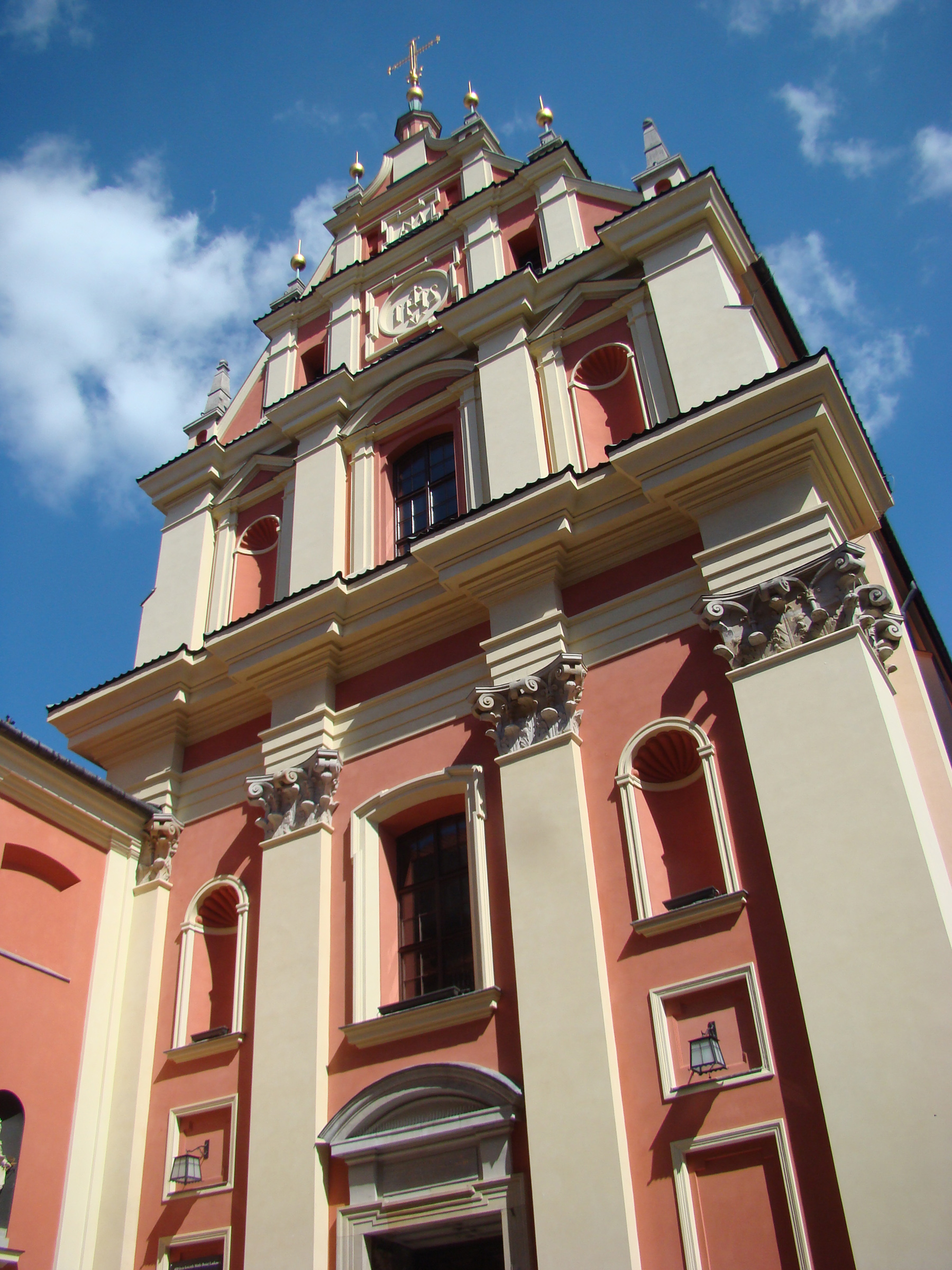
- Façade
- Church of the Gracious Mother of God
- Country: Poland
- Denomination: Catholic

Architecture
- Functional status: Active
- Architect: Jan Frankiewicz
- Style: Polish Mannerism
- Groundbreaking: 1609
- Completed: 1626
- Demolished: 1944

Administration
- Archdiocese: Warsaw

UNESCO World Heritage Site
- Type: Cultural
- Criteria: ii, vi
- Designated: 1980
- Part of: Historic Centre of Warsaw
- Reference no.: 30bis

Historic Monument of Poland
- Designated: 1994-09-08
- Part of: Warsaw – historic city center with the Royal Route and Wilanów
- Reference no.: M.P. 1994 nr 50 poz. 423

The Jesuit Church (Polish: Kościół Jezuitów), also known as Church of the Gracious Mother of God (Kościół Matki Bożej Łaskawej), is an ornate church within the Old Town precinct in Warsaw, Poland. The temple stands on Świętojańska Street, adjacent to St John's Cathedral, and is one of the most notable mannerist-style churches in Warsaw.

== History ==
The Jesuit Church was founded by King Sigismund III Vasa and Podkomorzy Andrzej Bobola the Old at Piotr Skarga's initiative, in 1609, for the Jesuits. The main building was constructed between 1609 and 1626 in the Polish Mannerist style by Jan Frankiewicz.

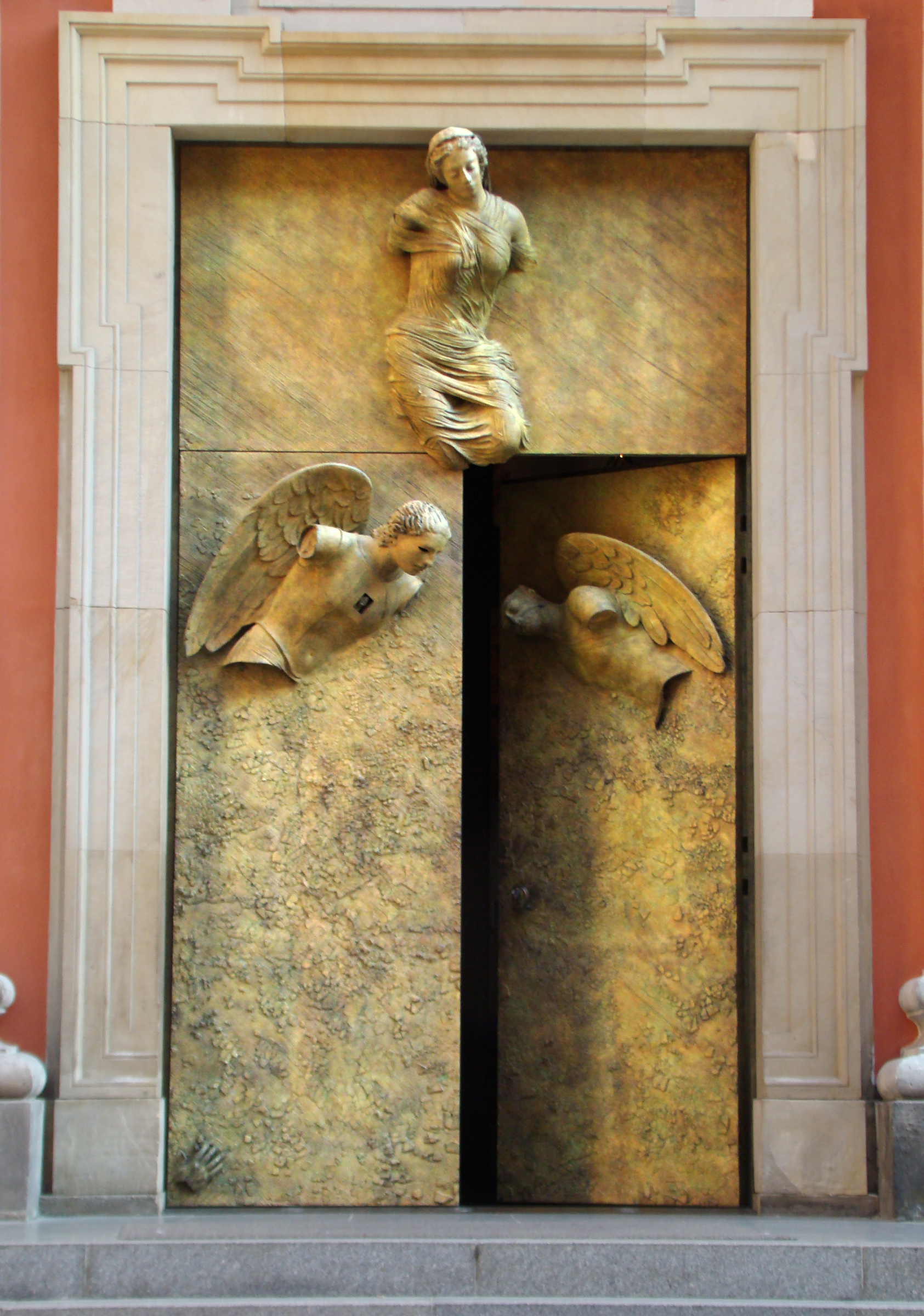
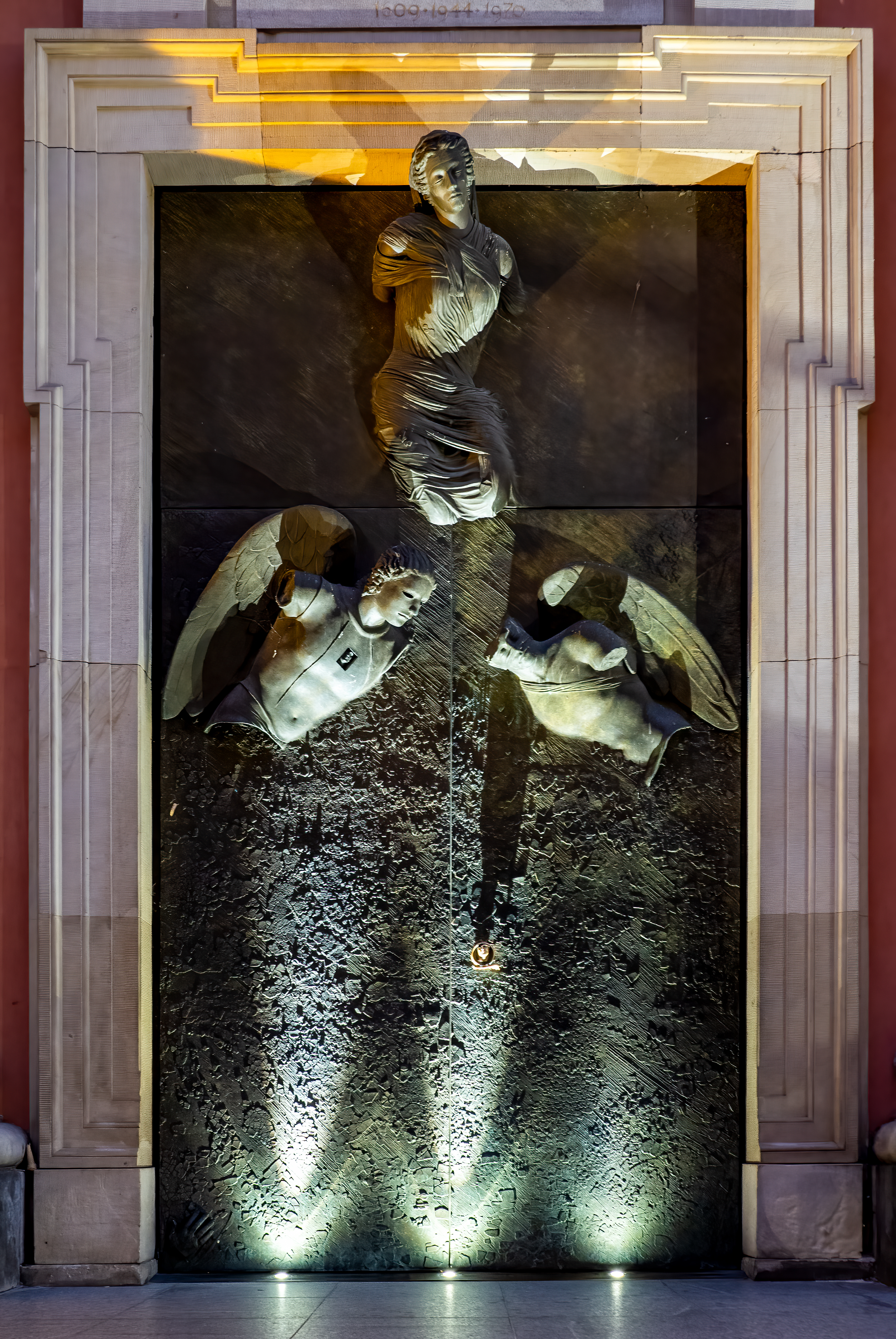
Church doors by Igor Mitoraj in daytime and illuminated at night

In 1627 the church was encompassed with three chapels, and in 1635 Urszula Meyerin, a great supporter of the Society of Jesus, was buried within. Meyerin funded a silver tabernacle for the church. She was also King Sigismund III's mistress, and was politically influential. Her grave was plundered and destroyed by the Swedes and Brandenburg Germans, in the 1650s, during the Deluge.

A vestibule was added to the interior of the temple in 1633, and a choir was added three years later. An altar made of silver was installed by Cardinal Charles Ferdinand Vasa in the 1640s. The interior of the church was damaged and looted in 1656.

An icon of Our Lady of Graces (Matka Boża Łaskawa), a gift from the Pope Innocent X, was introduced to the church and crowned in 1651. Its veneration has been growing, especially since the epidemic in 1664, when Blessed Virgin Mary was believed to save the city.

In later years the building became more and more ornate, with baroque furnishings and marble altars and floors. Two more chapels were added. When the order of Jesuits was dissolved in 1773, the church changed ownership several times. For some time it was a school church, later it was demoted to the role of the magazine of church furnishings, and then it was given to the order of Piarists. The Jesuits did not get the church back until the end of the First World War. In the 1920s and 1930s the church was renovated.

During World War II, after the Germans suppressed the Warsaw Uprising, they razed the Jesuit Church to the ground. All that remained of the four-hundred-year-old edifice was a great pile of rubble. Between the 1950s and 1973, the church was rebuilt in a simplified architectural style.

== Interior ==
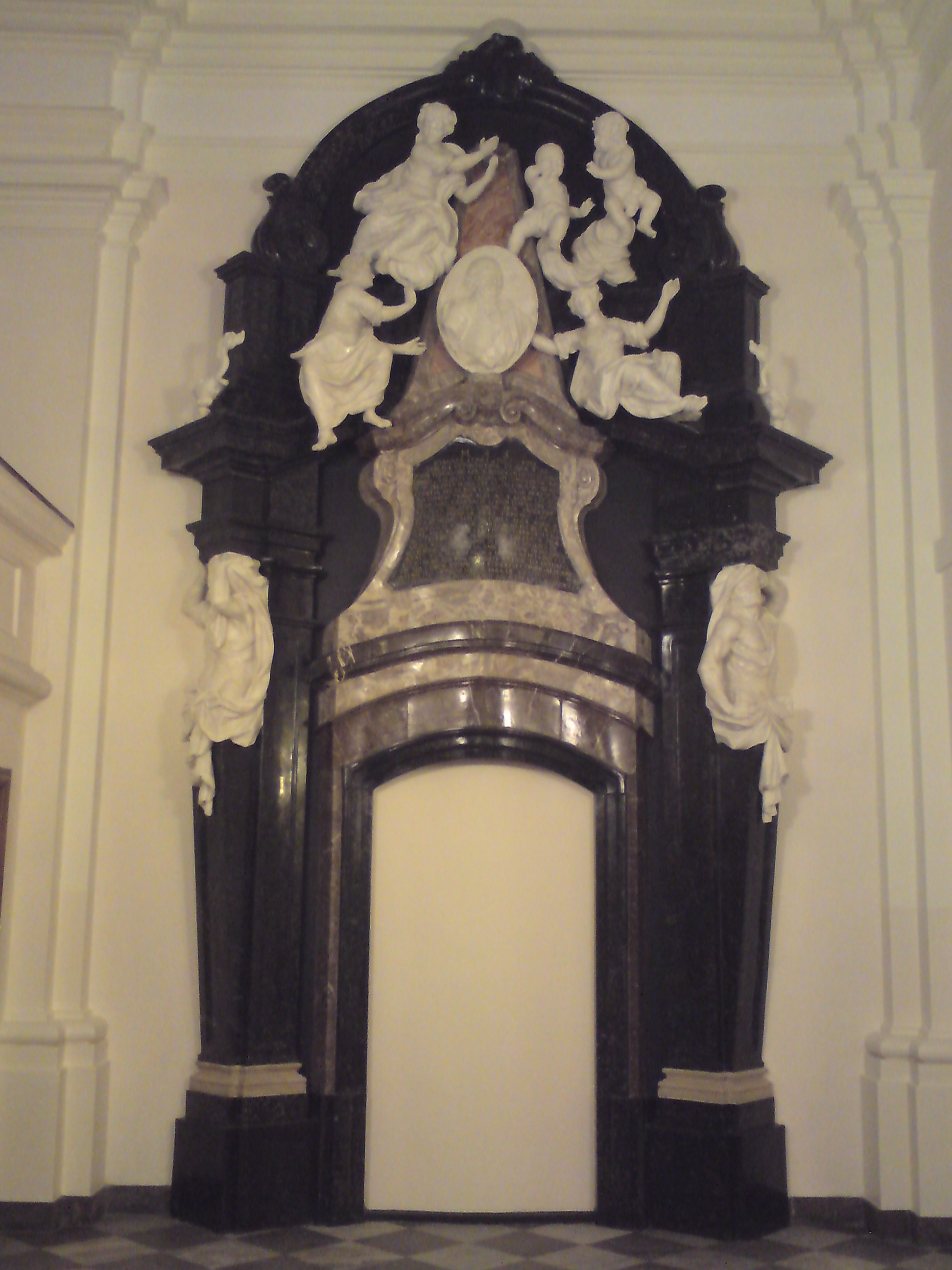
Jan Tarło's cenotaph by Jan Jerzy Plersch 1753, destroyed in 1944, reconstructed in 2010.

The facade is Mannerist, although the interior is completely modern, because very few of the original furnishings of the church were preserved. Inside, there are preserved fragments of a tomb monument of Jan Tarło carved by Jan Jerzy Plersch in white and black marble in 1753, together with reconstructed epitaphs of Sarbiewski, Konarski, Kopczyński and Kiliński. A painting of Our Lady of Grace brought to Poland in 1651 by bishop Juan de Torres as a gift from Pope Innocent X is also displayed, along with a preserved wooden crucifix from 1383, a baroque sculpture of Our Lady of Grace, from the beginning of the 18th century, and a stone sculpture of a laying bear from the half of 18th century.

== Burials ==
- Karol Ferdynand Vasa
- Maciej Kazimierz Sarbiewski (1595–1640), Europe's most prominent Latin poet of the 17th century.+

== Memorial plaque ==
- Jan Tarło's cenotaph

== See also ==
- List of mannerist structures in Central Poland
- List of Jesuit sites
- St. Jacek's Church in Warsaw
- Warsaw Old Town

== Images ==
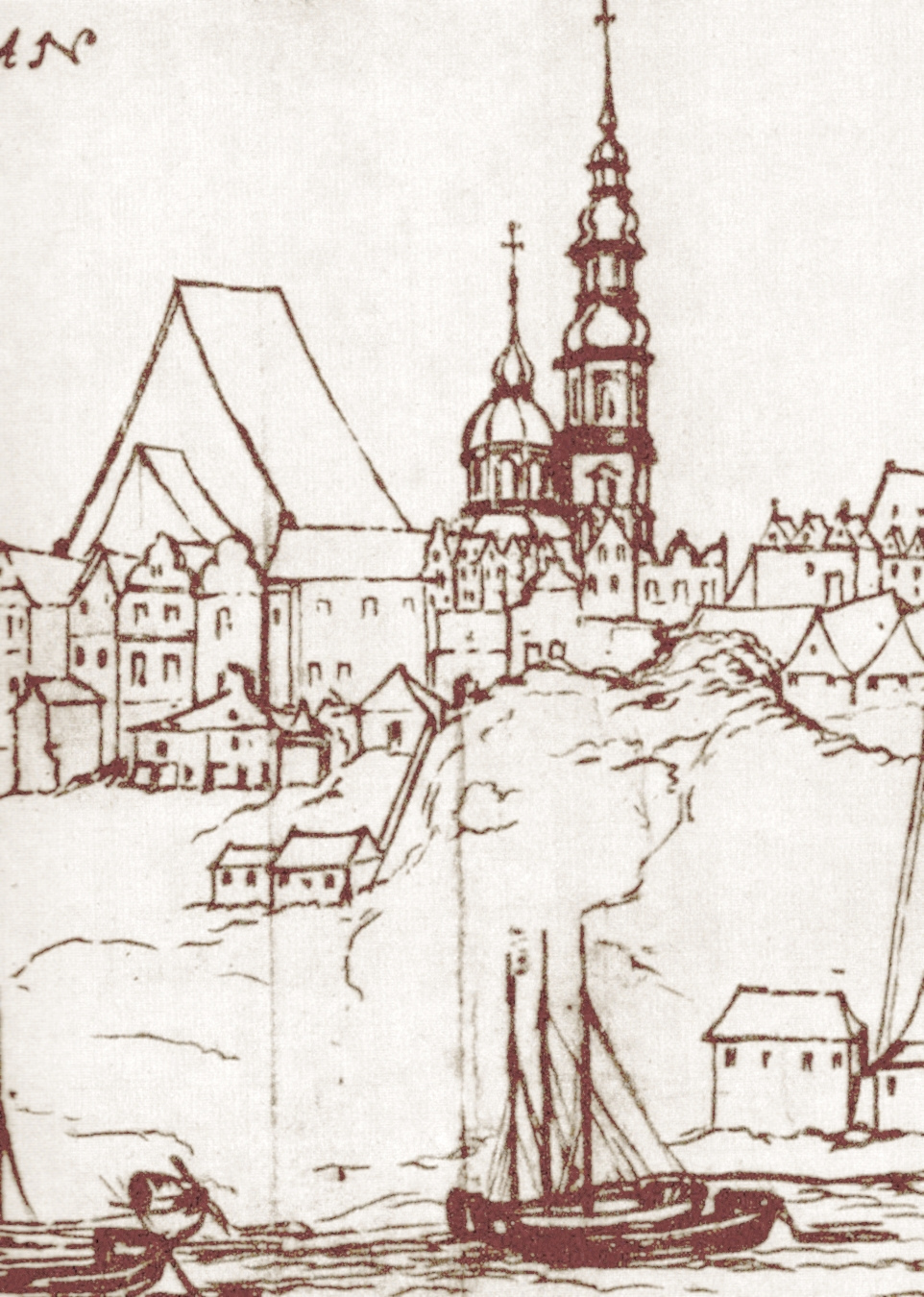
in 1627

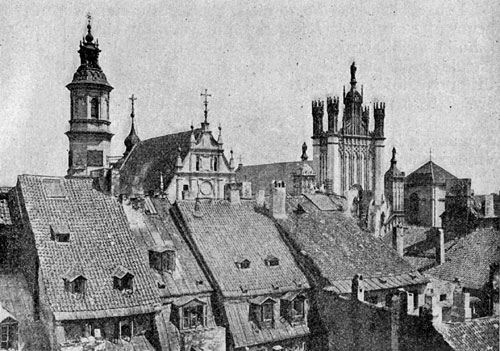
in the 1920s

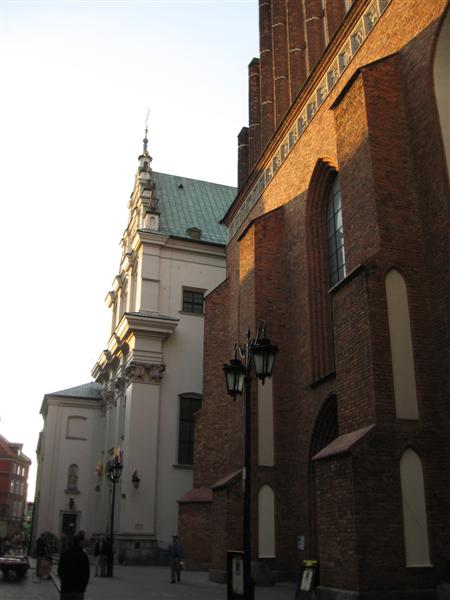
in 2006
