= Didžioji Street =

One of the oldest streets of Vilnius

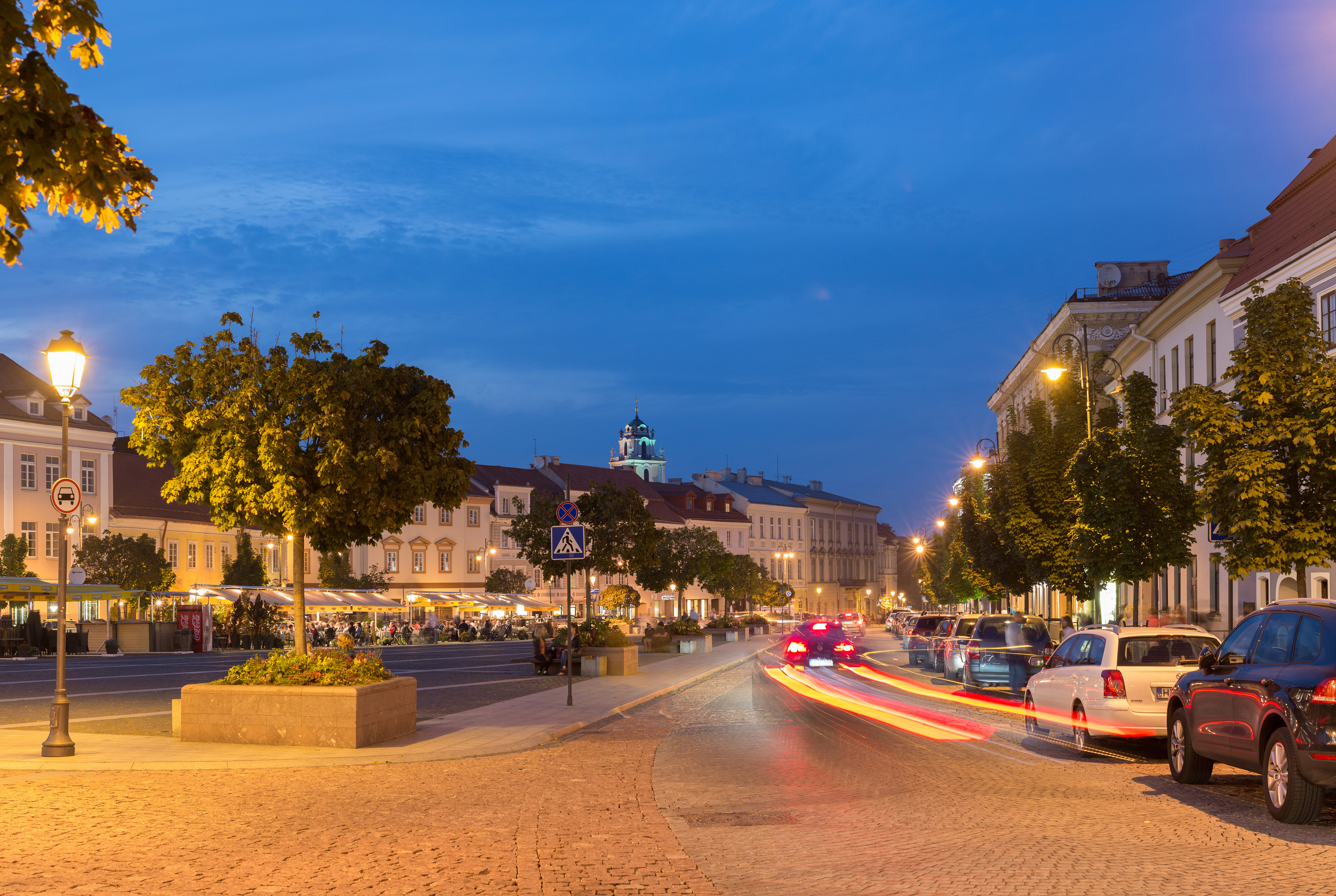
- Didžioji Street at dusk
- Interactive map of Didžioji Street
- Native name: Didžioji gatvė (Lithuanian)
- Former names: Wielka, M. Gorkio
- Length: 600 m (2,000 ft)
- Location: Vilnius, Lithuania
- Postal code: LT-01128
- Coordinates: 54°40′44″N 25°17′16″E

Didžioji Street (Lithuanian: Didžioji gatvė; Polish: ulica Wielka; literally "Great Street") is one of the oldest and historically most important streets in the Old Town of Vilnius, Lithuania. Approximately 600 metres (2,000 ft) long, it extends southwards from Pilies Street to Aušros Vartų Street, passing through Town Hall Square. Together with the adjoining streets, it formed part of the principal ceremonial and commercial route through the historic city, connecting the Vilnius Castle Complex with the southern approaches to Vilnius.

The street developed into one of the principal centres of civic, commercial and religious life in the city. Its historic buildings include the Vilnius Town Hall, the Church of St. Casimir, several Orthodox churches, and the former residences of prominent noble families, including the Radziwiłłs, Pacs and Chodkiewiczes. In 1522, Francysk Skaryna established a printing house on the street, where he published the first book printed in the territory of the Grand Duchy of Lithuania. During the Soviet period, the street formed part of a thoroughfare named after the Russian writer Maxim Gorky.

== Gallery ==
Painting of the Didžioji Street by Józef Peszka

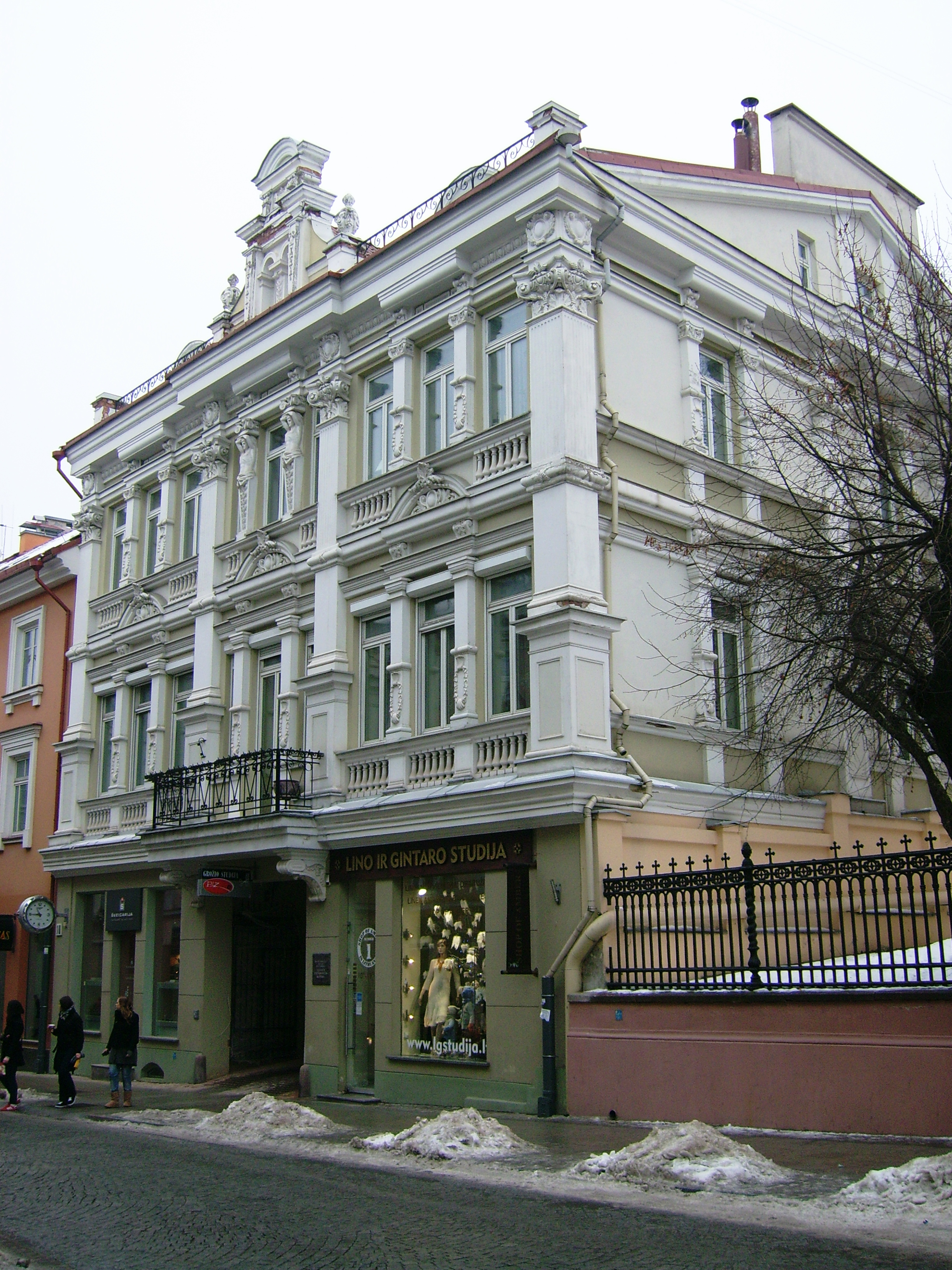
Building in which the first clinic in Lithuania was established in 1805

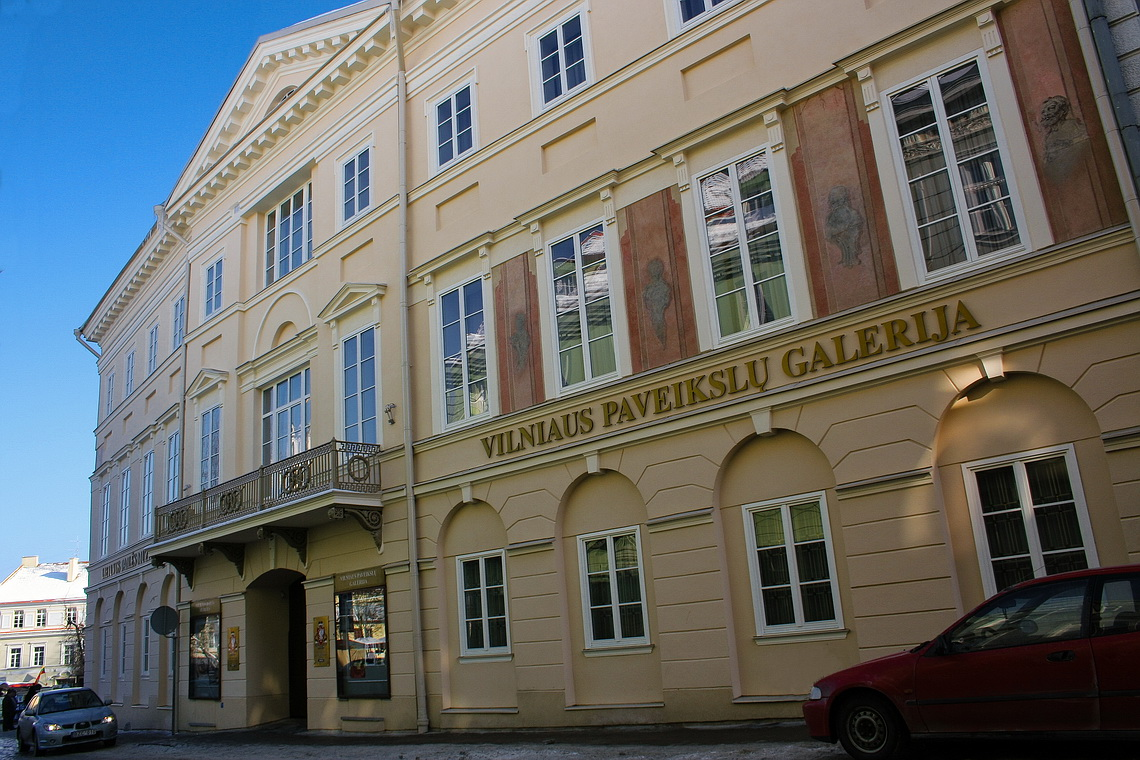
Vilnius Picture Gallery

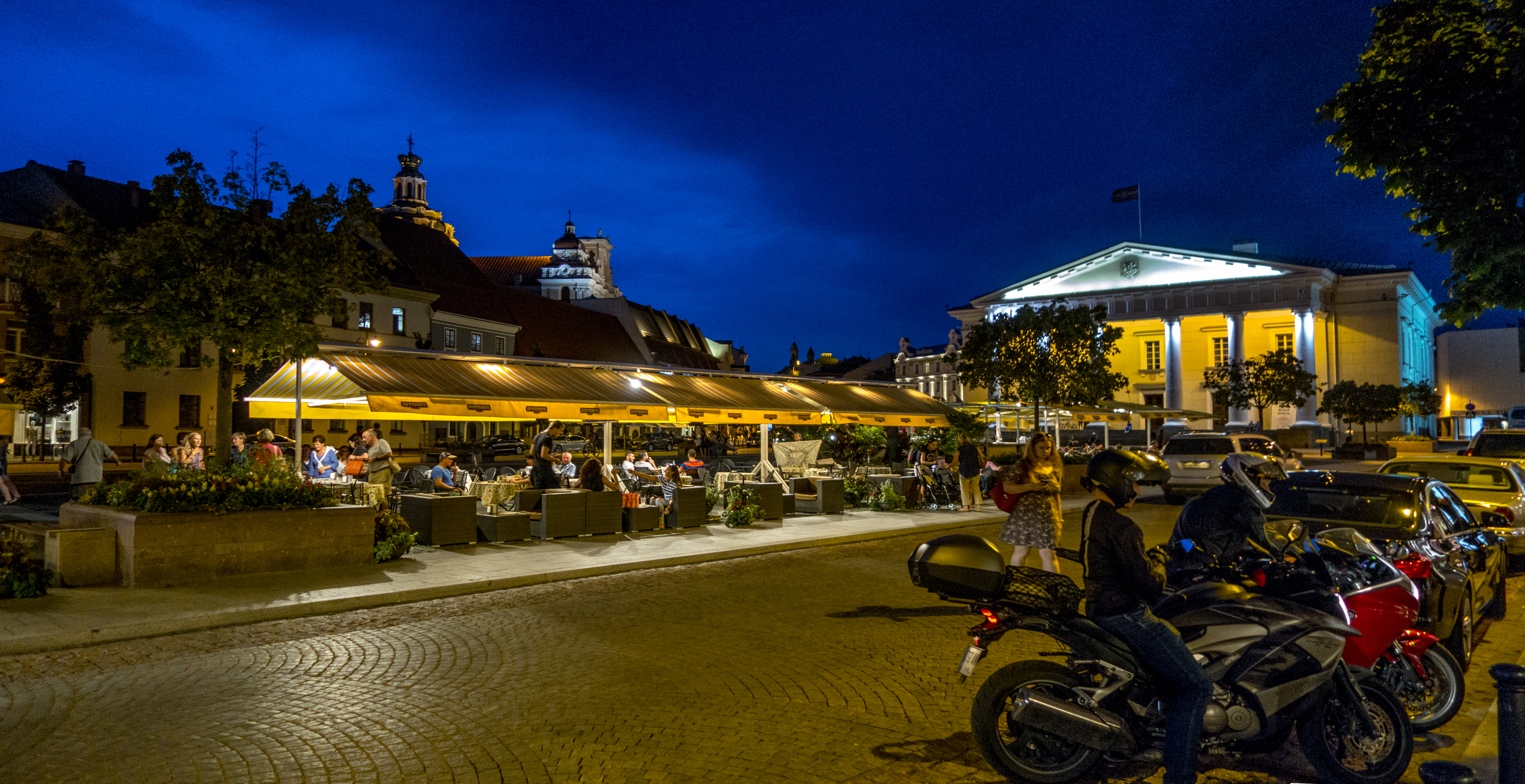
View towards the town hall at night

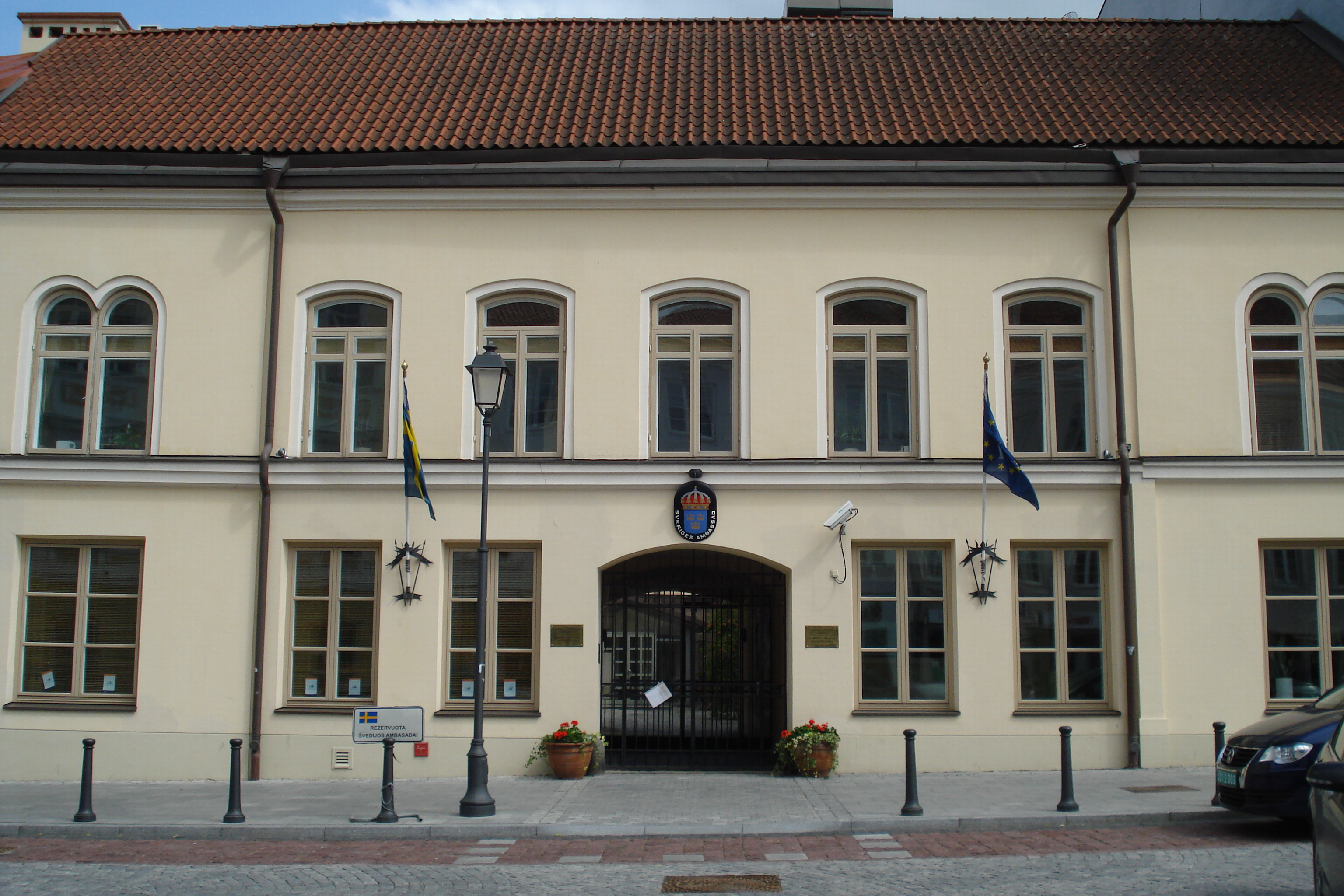
Swedish Embassy
