= Jan Frankiewicz =

Polish Jesuit architect (1559–1627)

- Born: 1559; Minsk, Grand Duchy of Lithuania
- Died: 1627 (aged 67–68)
- Occupation: Architect
- Buildings: Church of St. Casimir, Vilnius; Jesuit Church, Warsaw

Jan Frankiewicz (1559–1627) was a Polish Jesuit architect and builder active in the Crown of the Kingdom of Poland and the Grand Duchy of Lithuania. Born in Minsk, he moved to Nesvizh in 1594, where he worked on the construction of the Jesuit college under the supervision of the Italian architect Giovanni Maria Bernardoni. Following Bernardoni's departure for Kraków in 1599, Frankiewicz took over the management of construction works. He may also have supervised the construction of the Church of St. Nicholas in Mir.

From 1604, Frankiewicz directed the construction of the Church of St. Casimir and the adjoining Jesuit professed house in Vilnius. He is considered a probable author of the church's architectural design. The design of the Jesuit church in Warsaw has also been attributed to him, although its authorship remains disputed. In 1625–1626, he returned to Nesvizh, where he worked on the construction of residential buildings.

== Bibliography ==
- Betlej, Andrzej (2018). "Architecture of Jesuit Churches in the Former Polish-Lithuanian Commonwealth, 1564–1773" (PDF). Journal of Jesuit Studies. 5 (3): 352–384. doi:10.1163/22141332-00503002. ISSN 2214-1324.
- Bernatowicz, Tadeusz (1999). "Le chiese del Bernardoni nel Ducato di Njazviz". In Graciotti, Sante; Kowalczyk, Jerzy (eds.). L’architetto Gian Maria Bernardoni SJ tra l’Italia e le terre dell’Europa centro-orientale (PDF) (in Italian). Rome: Il Calamo. pp. 39–55.
