= Antašava =

- Town
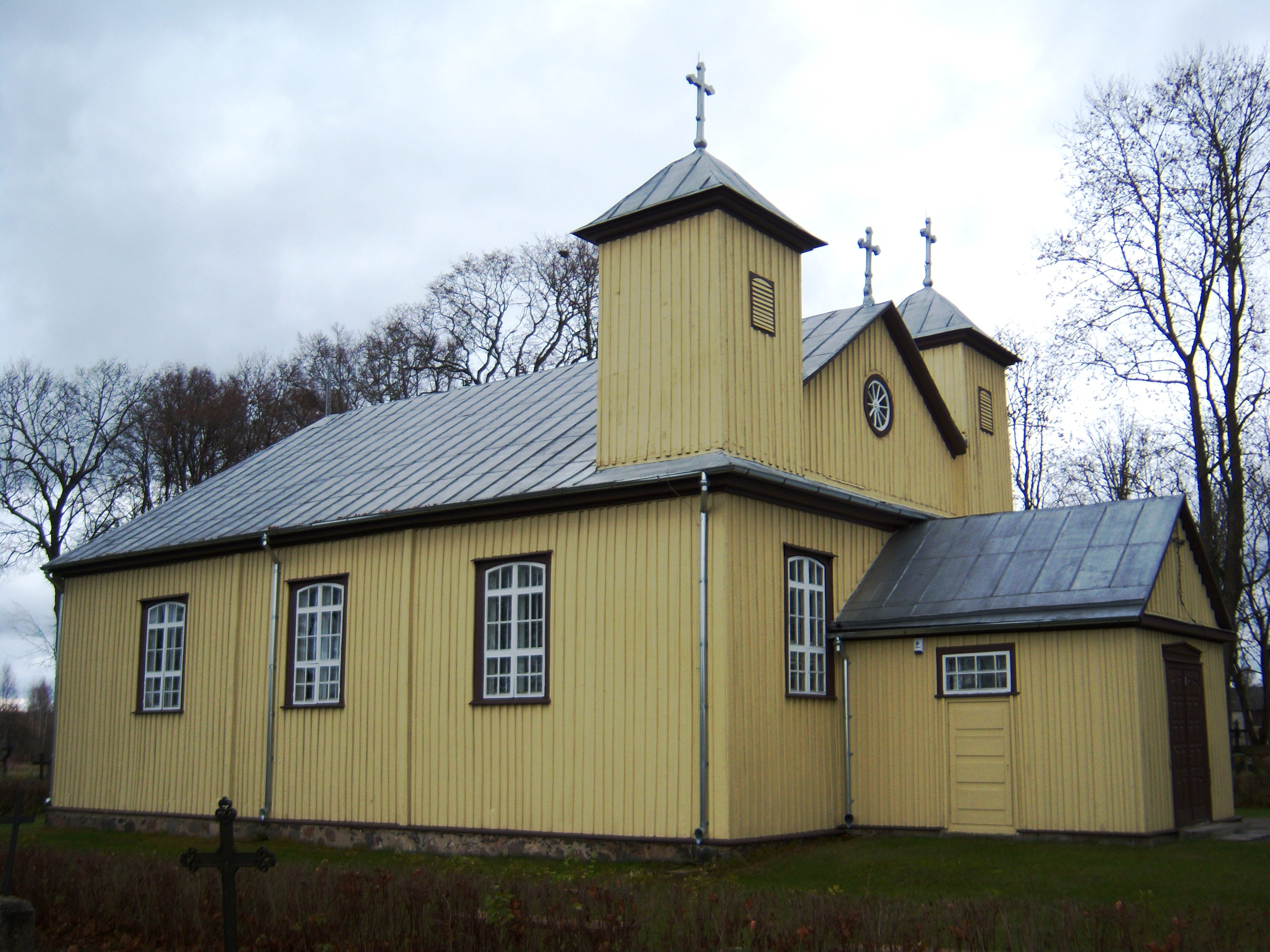

- Location within Lithuania
- Coordinates: 55°54′20″N 24°48′20″E
- Country: Lithuania
- County: Panevėžys County

Population (2011)
  - Total: 227
- Time zone: UTC+2 (EET)
  - Summer (DST): UTC+3 (EEST)

Antašava (Polish: Antoszew) is a small town in Panevėžys County, in north-eastern Lithuania. According to the 2011 census, the town has a population of 227 people.

== Notable people ==
- Artist Vėra Šleivytė was born in Antašava on 6 December 1906.
