= Jan Jerzy Plersch =

Polish sculptor

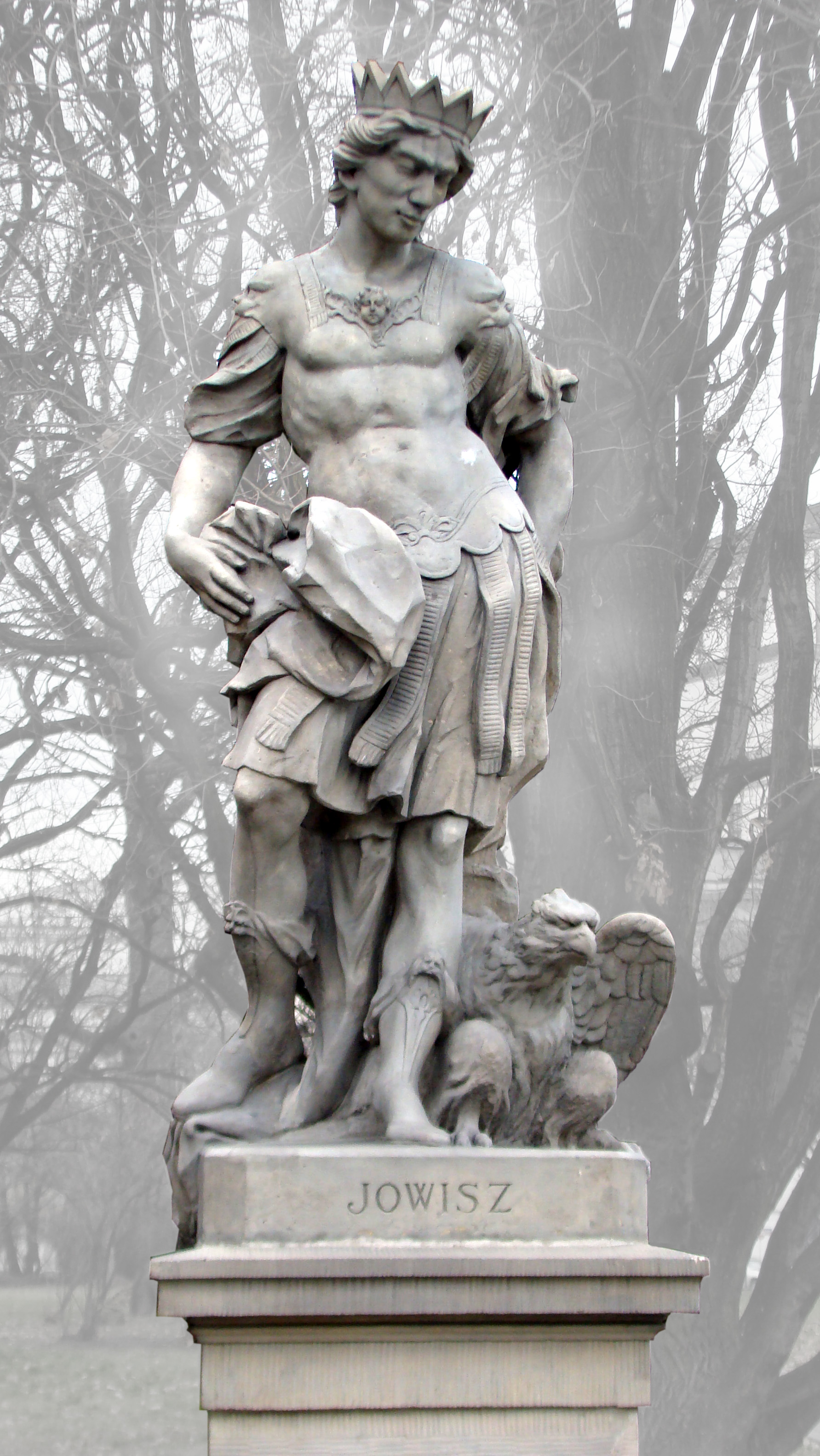
Intellect by Jan Jerzy Plersch, Saxon Garden, Warsaw

Jan Jerzy Plersch also Johann Georg Plersch (1704 or 1705 – 1 January 1774) was a Polish sculptor of German origin.

The design of Plersch's sculptures refers to some extent to the so-called "School of Lviv" in sculpture. A symbolic tombstone of Governor Jan Tarło in the church portal of the Jesuit Church, Warsaw (destroyed during World War II, merged and reconstructed in 2010) is comparable to the best achievements of the 18th century European sculpture, both in terms of content and execution.

Other important works by Plersch include the Marriage of Maria and the pulpit for the Carmelite Church, Warsaw, and sculpture from the upper floor of the facade of the Church of the Visitation of the Blessed Virgin Mary, Warsaw, renovated in 2009. That included Elizabeth and Mary from the scene of the Visitation and Saint Joseph, Saint Joachim and Saint Anne, and Zechariah. He also produced some works for the Holy Cross Church, Warsaw and St. Martin's Church, Warsaw. His son Jan Bogumił Plersch also Johann Johann Gottlieb Plersch was a portrait painter and decorator at the court of King Stanisław August Poniatowski.
