= St. John the Baptist Cathedral, Lublin =

Coordinates: 51.2468°N 22.5685°E

St. John the Baptist Cathedral
- Archikatedra św. Jana Chrzciciela
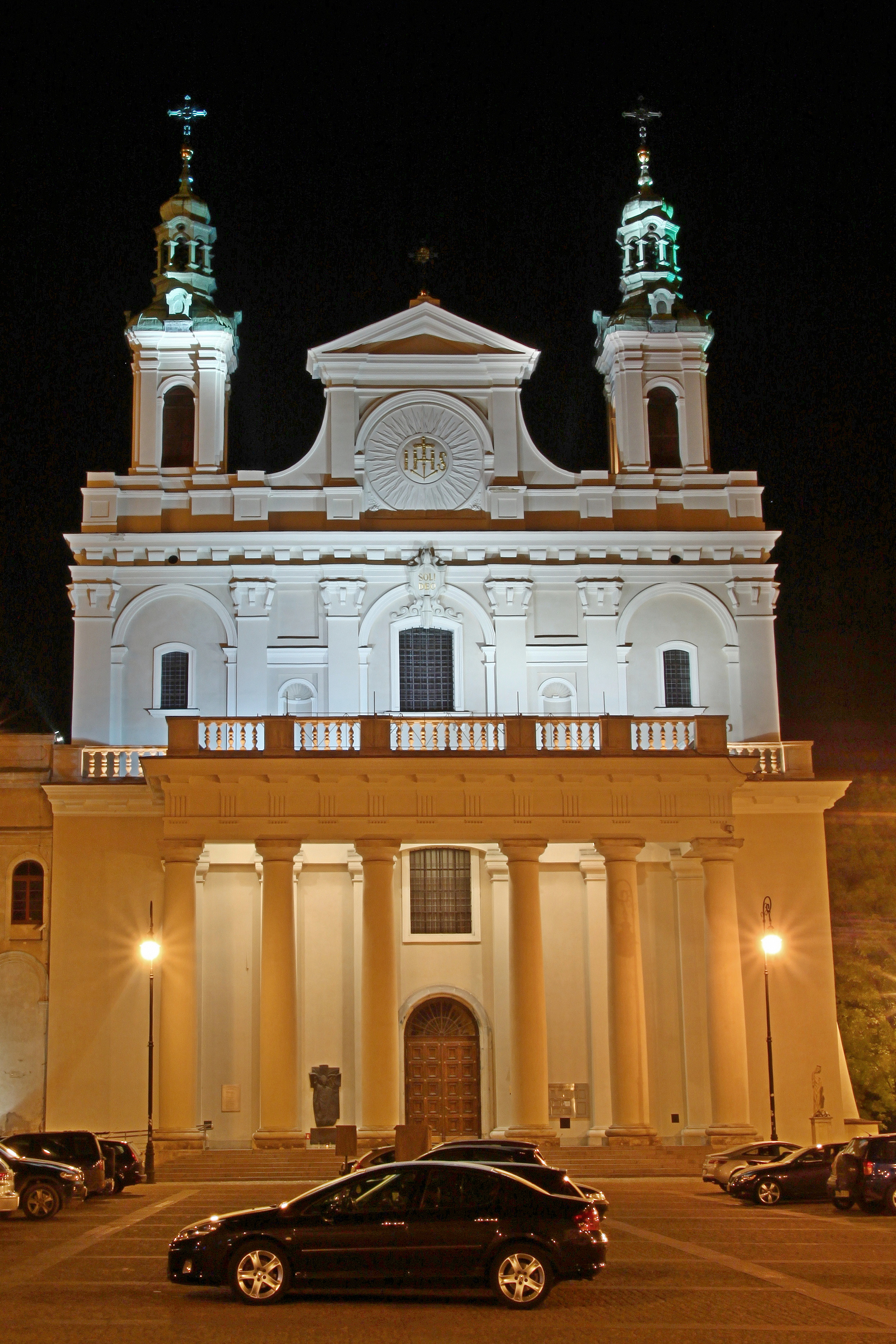
- St. John the Baptist Cathedral
- Location: Lublin
- Country: Poland
- Denomination: Roman Catholic Church

Historic Monument of Poland
- Designated: 2007-04-25
- Part of: Lublin – historic architectural and urban ensemble
- Reference no.: Dz. U. z 2007 r. Nr 86, poz. 574

The Cathedral of Saint John the Baptist (Polish: Archikatedra św. Jana Chrzciciela ) or simply Lublin Cathedral in Lublin, Poland is the cathedral church of the Roman Catholic Archdiocese of Lublin.

It was built between 1592 and 1617 as a church of the Society of Jesus. One of the first baroque churches in Poland, it was modeled after the Chiesa del Gesù in Rome of Giovanni Maria Bernardoni. It is a three-aisled basilica with a wide nave.. It was designated cathedral in the early 19th century, and since 1992, the archdiocesan cathedral.

== See also ==
- Catholic Church in Poland
- List of Jesuit sites
