= Corpus Christi Church, Nyasvizh =

Roman Catholic church in Niasviž, Belarus

Coordinates: 53°13′14.49″N 26°41′1.49″E

Corpus Christi Church
- Касьцёл Божага Цела ў Нясьвіжы
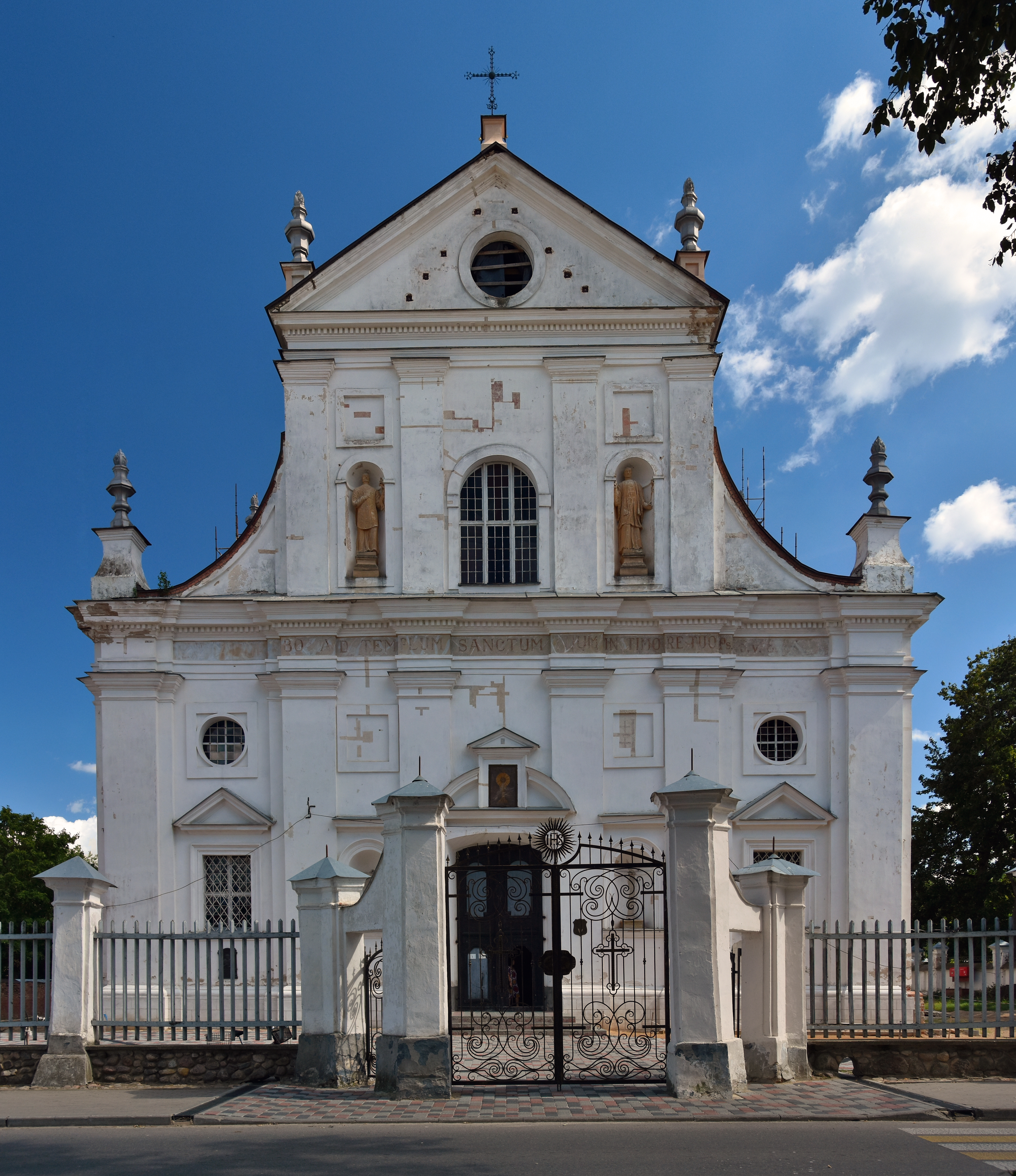
- Corpus Christi Church
- Location: Nyasvizh
- Country: Belarus
- Denomination: Roman Catholic Church
- Religious institute: Society of Jesus

History
- Founder: Mikołaj Krzysztof "the Orphan" Radziwiłł

Architecture
- Architect: Giovanni Maria Bernardoni
- Style: Baroque
- Years built: 1584–1593

The Corpus Christi Church (Belarusian: Касцёл Божага Цела, Lithuanian: Dievo Kūno bažnyčia, Polish: Kościół Bożego Ciała) in Nyasvizh (Nesvizh), Belarus, is an early Jesuit church, and one of the oldest Baroque structures outside Italy, influencing the later architecture of Poland, Belarus and Lithuania. Commissioned by Prince Nicholas Radziwill and constructed between 1587 and 1593 by Gian Maria Bernardoni during the times of the Polish–Lithuanian Commonwealth, it contains tombs of powerful Radziwiłł family members.

The church is included into the UNESCO World Heritage list.

== History ==
=== Construction and architecture ===
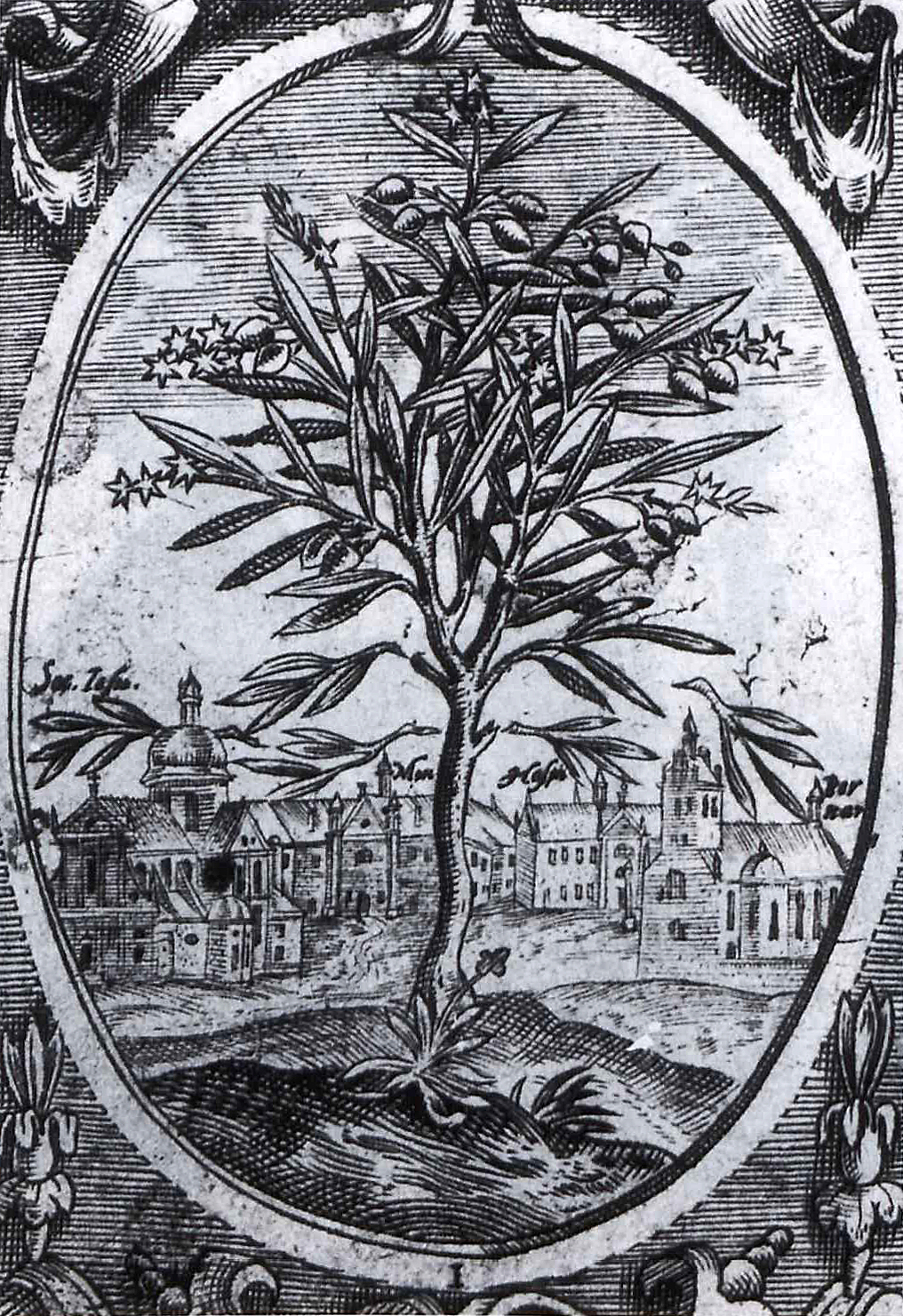
A fragment from a painting featuring Nyasvizh and the Corpus Christi Church, 1604

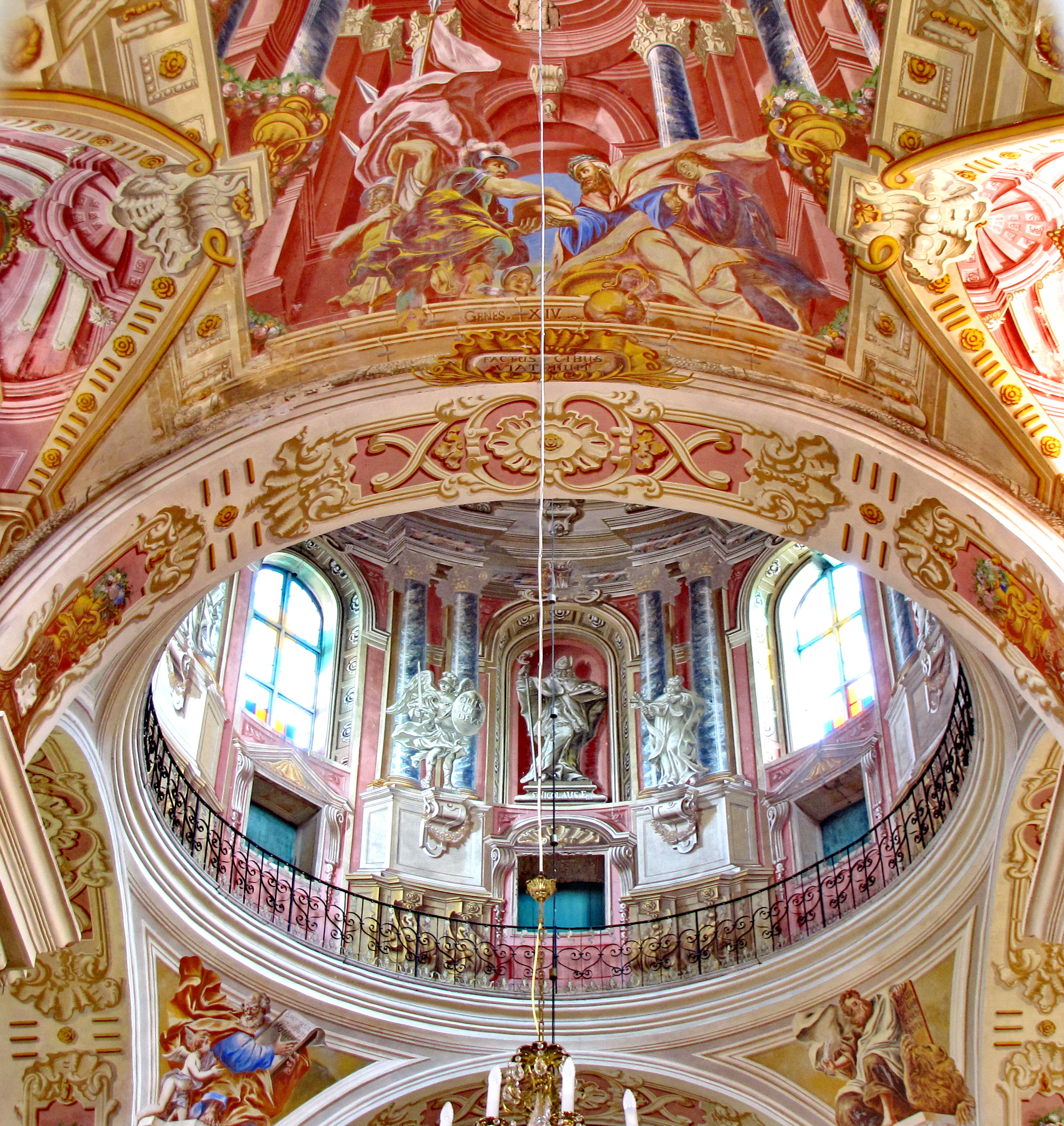
The interior of the church

The first wooden Corpus Christi church was built in 1510 by Petr Kishka who owned Nesvizh in the early 16th century. In 1555 Nikolai Cherniy Radziwiłł (lit. 'the Black') gave the church to the Calvinists.

The stone Corpus Christi church was founded by Mikołaj Krzysztof "the Orphan" Radziwiłł, who decided to return it to Catholicism. On August 19, 1584, he signed a document allowing the Society of Jesus to stay in the city of Nesvizh. The architect Giovanni Maria Bernardoni was invited to head the construction of the collegium and the church. He was inspired by the Church of the Gesù in Rome. However, he died in Kraków in 1605 and the dome of the Nesvizh church was completed by his apprentice Giuseppe Brisio. The nave is 17.8 m (58 ft) high and the dome is almost two times higher. The frescoes widely used compositions by Peter Paul Rubens. The first mass was chanted on November 1, 1593.

The altar was painted by the Radziwiłłs' court artist, Ksavery Dominik Gesksky. He also restored the dome between 1752 and 1754. In 1747 Italian artist Maurizio Pedetti built a chapel near the church for Thaddeus Bulgarin's grandfather.

During World War II in 1944 the building was hit by a bomb, which destroyed the roof and started a fire. The church was restored after the war.

The church's organ was constructed in the 19th century by a master from Vilnius, Vishnevsky. It survived the wars due to the efforts of its priest Grigoriy Kolosovsky and the organist Edvard Girdo. When in 1944 the retreating German troops took all the nonferrous metals and ordered the instrument to be dismantled and transported to Germany, Kolosovsky managed to take it off the train and return it to the church by bribing the train's accountant. Girdo then buried the pipes in the ground and dug them up only after the war's end.

=== 21st century ===
The last burial took place on June 8, 2000, when Anthony Radziwiłł's ashes were taken from London to the church's Radziwiłł crypt.

In 2010 the authorities started the church's restoration. The restorers discovered a piece of the bomb that hit the building in 1944. They also found out that after the war there was a shortage of materials, and in order to save the church the locals installed cut telegraph poles instead of the destroyed rafters, which preserved the unique interiors into the 21st century. Also in 2010, the restorers discovered medieval paintings under layers of plaster. After some research it turned out that the whole interior of the church was fully covered with frescoes; almost 80 % are well-preserved.

In 2018 the crypt was damaged by flooding.

The restoration was planned to be finished in 2021.

== See also ==
- Catholic Church in Belarus
- 16th-century Western domes
- List of Jesuit sites

== Sources ==
- Bazhenova, O. D. (2010). Радзивилловский Несвиж [Radziwiłłs Nesvizh]. Minsk: Kharvest. p. 416. ISBN 978-985-13-9752-1.
