= Giovanni Maria Bernardoni =

Italian architect (1541–1605)

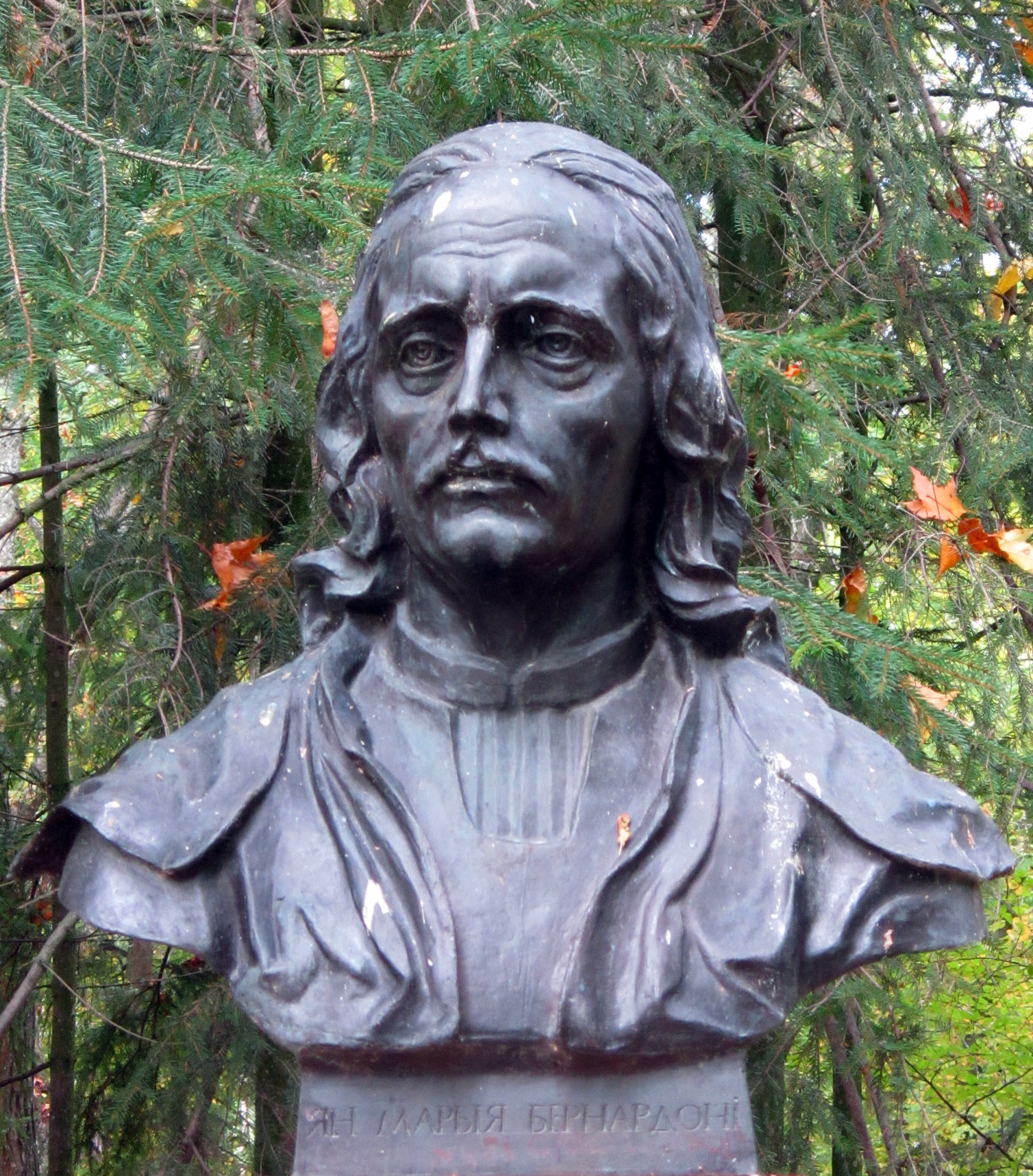
- Bust of Bernardoni in Old Nyasvizh Park
- Born: 1541; Cagno, Italy
- Died: 1605 (aged 63–64); Kraków, Poland
- Occupation: Architect
- Buildings: Church of St. Peter and Paul in Kraków, Church of Corpus Christi in Nyasvizh, Monastery of St. Bernardin in Kalwaria Zebrzydowska

Giovanni Maria Bernardoni (1541–1605) was a Jesuit and an Italian architect who was the first to design the Baroque style in Poland and the Grand Duchy of Lithuania.

== Early life ==
Giovanni Maria Bernardoni was born in northern Italy in the commune of Cagno in 1541. He worked as a mason until he was 23 years old upon which he left for Rome to join the Order of the Jesuits and become an architect. The Order directed him towards the construction of their main church in Rome, the Church of the Gesù, where he worked for 6 years. The construction was under the supervision of the famous Italian architect and the inspector of the Order's construction projects, John Tristan.

== Architectural work ==
=== Italy ===
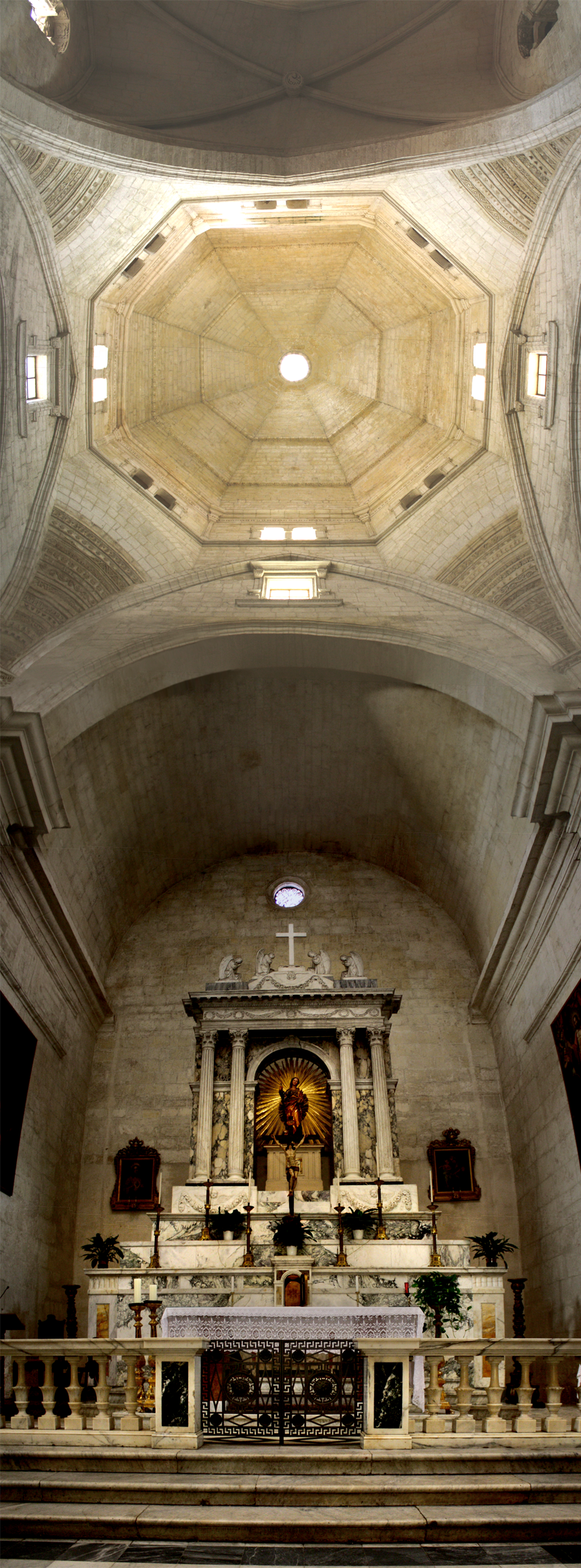
Church of Saint Catherine, Sassari

Starting in 1573, Bernardoni worked on the construction of churches in Milan, Florence, Naples, and Abruzzo. The Chief Vicar of the Province Bernardoni was in at the time wrote about him to the Superior General of the Society of Jesus saying: "We are happy that God has gladdened us by giving us this master who was essential in helping Father Giovanni".

Later, he goes on to work in Sardinia, specifically Cagliari, where he founds the Church of St. Michael towards the end of 1578 and the Church of Saint Catherine in Sassari (1579-1609).

== Lithuania and Poland ==
In 1583, by command of the head of the Jesuit Order, Bernardoni was sent to the Grand Duchy of Lithuania where Prince Nicholas Radziwill had already been asking for an architect for a long time. However, he wasn't able to make it to his new assignment since on the way there, Bernardoni was taken in Lublin by the rector of the Gdańsk Jesuit College, Christopher Warszewicki who was very influential in Poland. In Lublin, Bernardoni worked for 3 years doing projects for the Lublin College and churches in Poznań, Kalisz, and a restoration after a fire in the Bridgettines convent in Gdańsk.

=== Nyasvizh ===
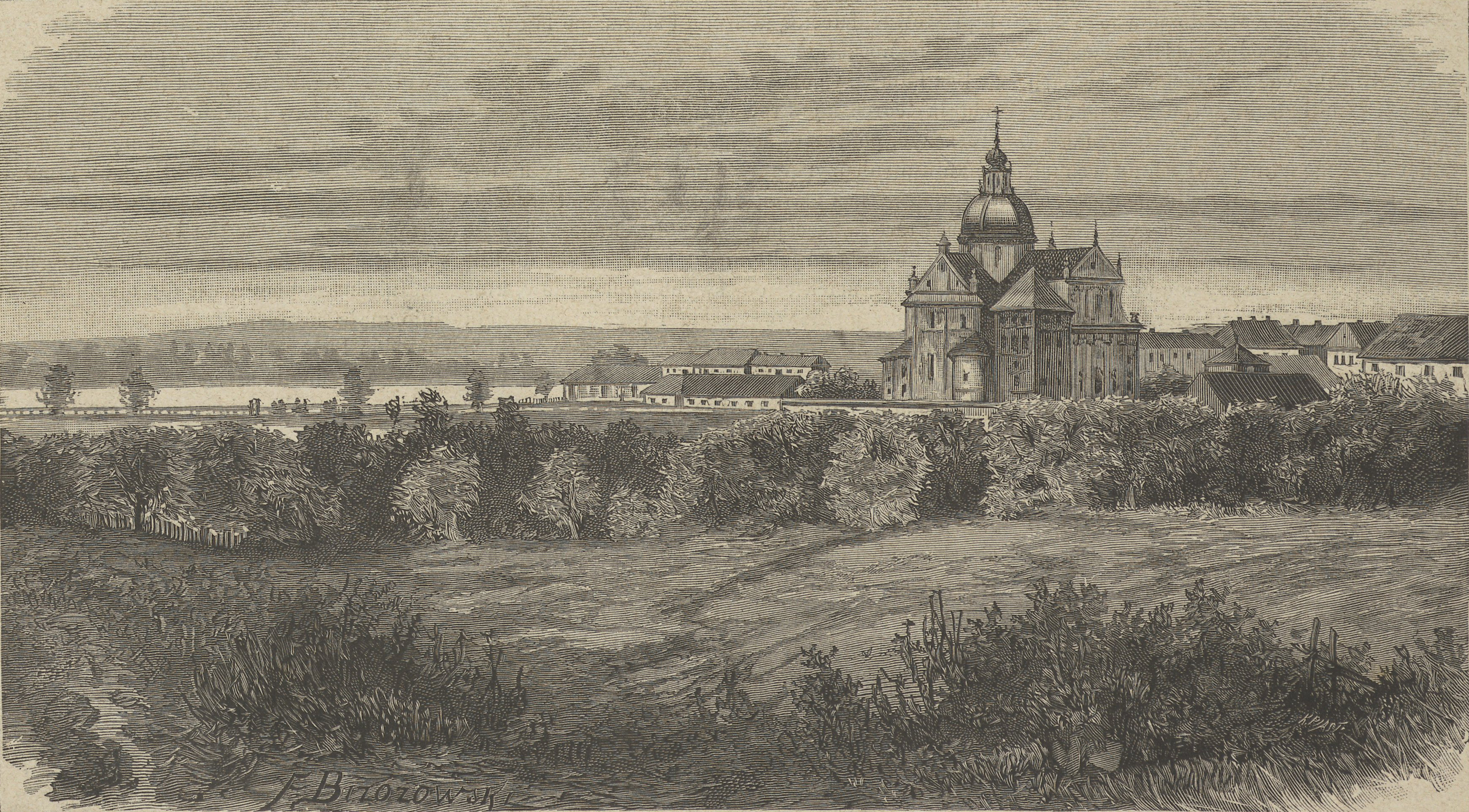
Jesuit Church at Nyasvizh in the 19th century by artist Kazimezh Pyastushkevich

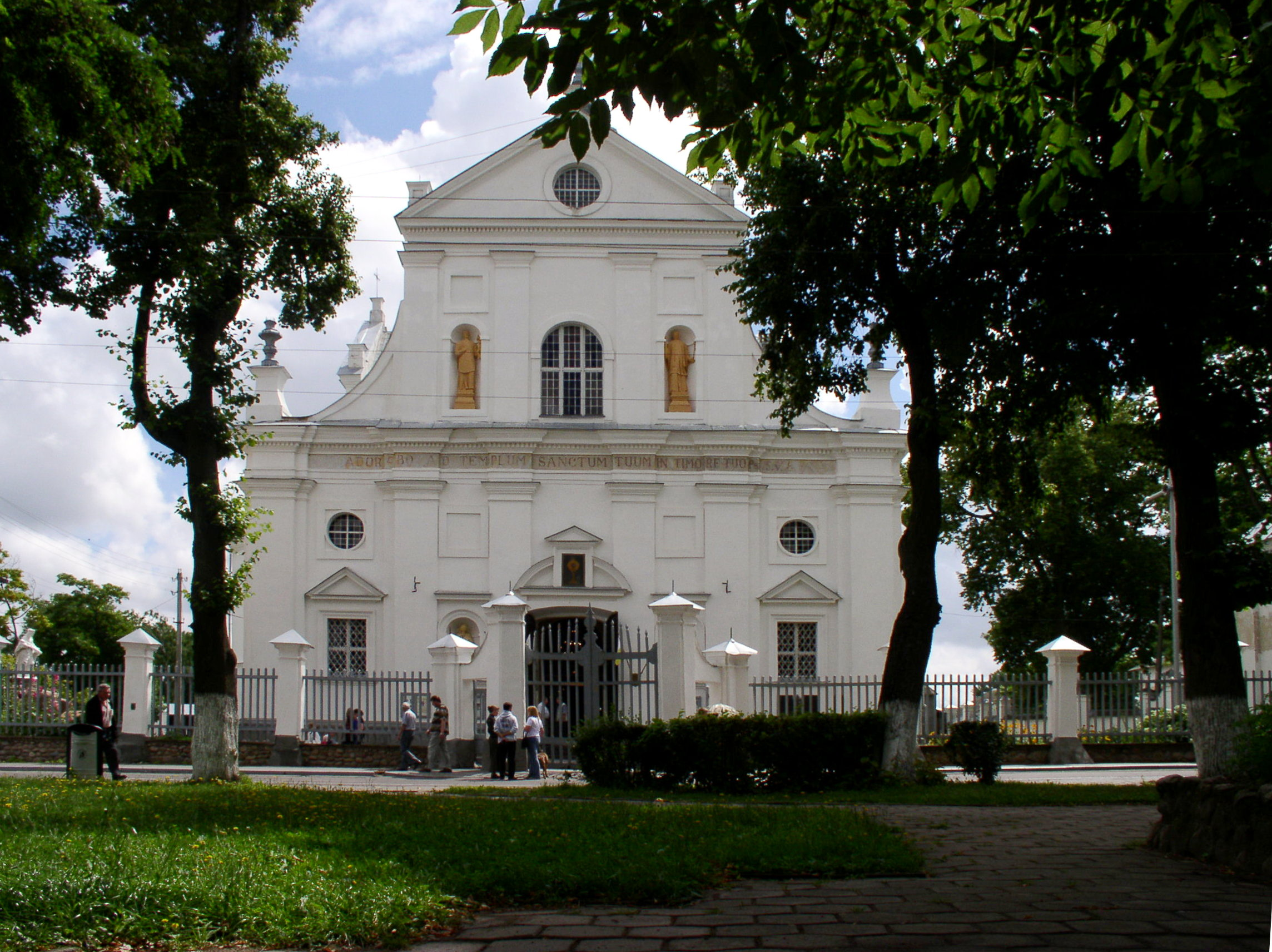
Facade of the Corpus Christi Church in Nyasvizh

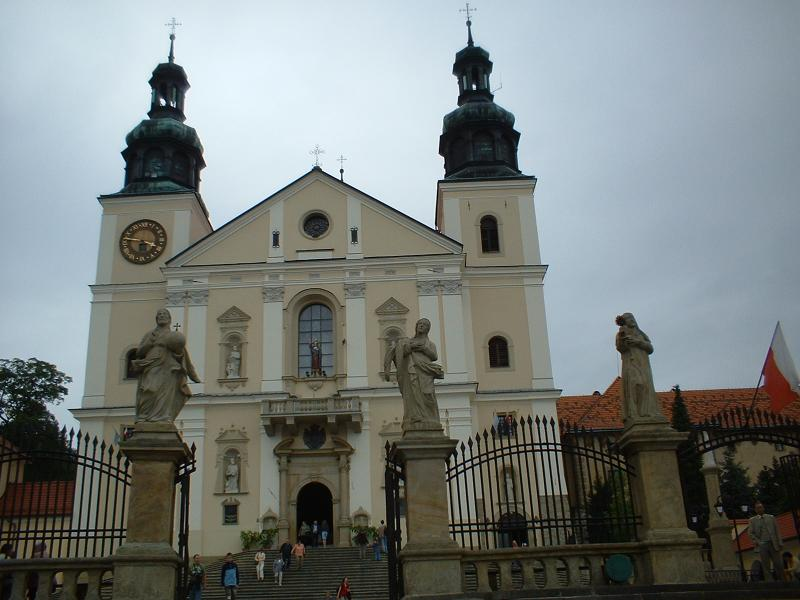
Franciscan Monastery and Church in Kalwaria Zebrzydowska

After the persistent reminders of Prince Radziwiłł to the Order of Jesuits for an architect, in 1586 Bernardoni comes to Nyasvizh and stays there for 13 years. There was a lot of work to do: firstly, the need to oversee the construction of Nyasvizh college which had just begun. The project had already been prepared in Rome by Giovanni de Rossi, Bernardoni only needed to make adjustments and corrections. The main project was the local Church of the Jesuits which had to be designed and built. The prototype for this church became the main church of the Order of the Jesuits in Rome.

Work in Nyasvizh moved quickly although before Bernardoni was a difficult task: in addition to the need to keep the style of buildings dictated by the Jesuits, the wishes of Prince Radziwiłł had to also be considered - including that the temple be built as a tomb for the Radziwiłł's. Due to the multipurpose nature of the church, the project require a lot of precision. For example, there were four staircases to ensure there would be a different path to separate locations and choirs for members of the princely family, priests, students of the college, and the commoners. There was also established two separate entrances to the crypt-dungeons, where different parts of the dungeon held the coffins of princes, monks, and eminent members of the community.

It is known that while working in Nyasvizh, Bernardoni helped Minsk-born former furrier Jan Frankiewicz, who after joining the Jesuits worked in Nyasvizh as a baker and was taught to be an architect by Bernardoni. Later, at the beginning of the 17th century, Frankiewicz built the St. Casimir's Church in Vilnius, which still stands at the Town Hall Square.

Over the years, many churches in Nyasvizh were simplified, redone, and had additions made to them especially in the middle of the 18th century, but the stylistic basis of the building, both inside and outside remains unchanged since the times of Bernardoni. Apparently, the Radziwiłł's were involved in the design process of many of the buildings. In November 1593, the construction of the church was completed and the first services there were held.

Jesuit churches in Nyasvizh were considered the first buildings built in the Baroque style on the territory of the Polish–Lithuanian Commonwealth simply because they were completed more quickly than others, even those that were started being built much earlier. This is thanks to the exclusive interest of Radziwiłł's in the project, who did not allow interruptions in the construction, who promptly gave money to such an extent that in the end amounted to more than the previously agreed cost.

In 1993 a bust of Giovanni Bernardoni by sculptor Nicholas Gumilev was placed in the Old Nyasvizh Park.

=== Kraków ===
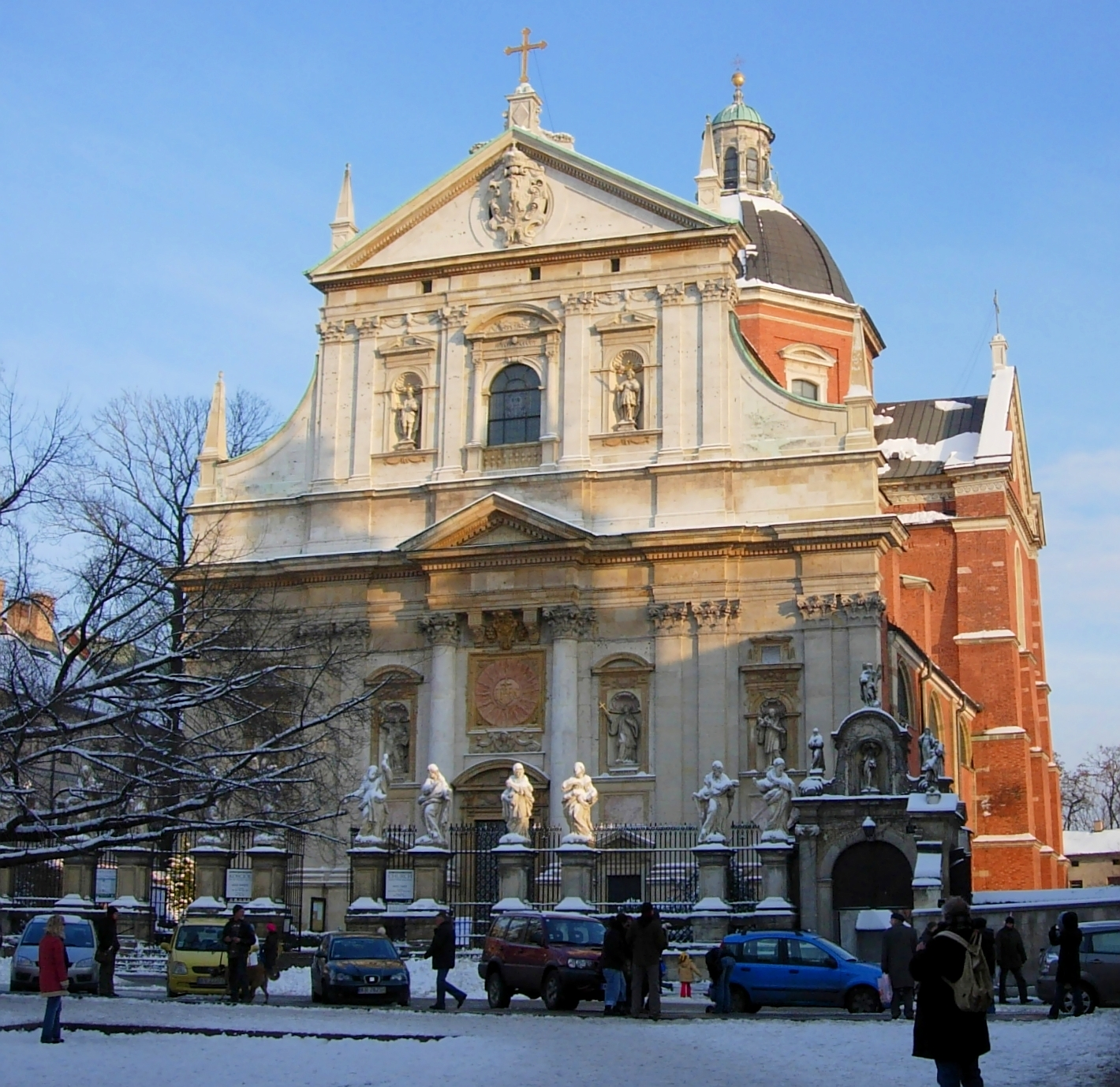
Church of Sts. Peter and Paul Church in Kraków

Upon completion of his works in Nyasvizh, in 1599 Bernardoni goes to Kraków for the construction of the Church of Sts. Peter and Paul as well as completing the Monastery of St. Bernard in Kalwaria Zebrzydowska and St. Casimir in Vilnius.

In 1605, when the Church of Sts. Peter and Paul had only the dome left to build, the walls cracked to which Bernardoni orders the foundation to be dug so the walls could be strengthened; this was not his fault - the foundation was laid down by a different architect. Bernardoni managed to fix his predecessor's mistake and the dome was quickly erected where it remains till this day. He never saw the completion of his last work as he died that same year, in 1605.

== Notable buildings ==
- Church of St. Voytseha and St. Stanislav Bskupa in Kalisz (1592–1597)
- Church of Corpus Christi in Nyasvizh (1587–1593)
- Church of Sts. Peter and Paul in Kraków (1597–1619)
- Basilica of Our Lady of the Angels in Kalwaria Zebrzydowska (1603–1609)
- Church of St. Casimir in Vilnius (1604–1616) – designed by his student Jan Frankiewicz
