= Cathedral Square, Vilnius =

Square in Vilnius, Lithuania

Coordinates: 54°41′07″N 25°17′15″E

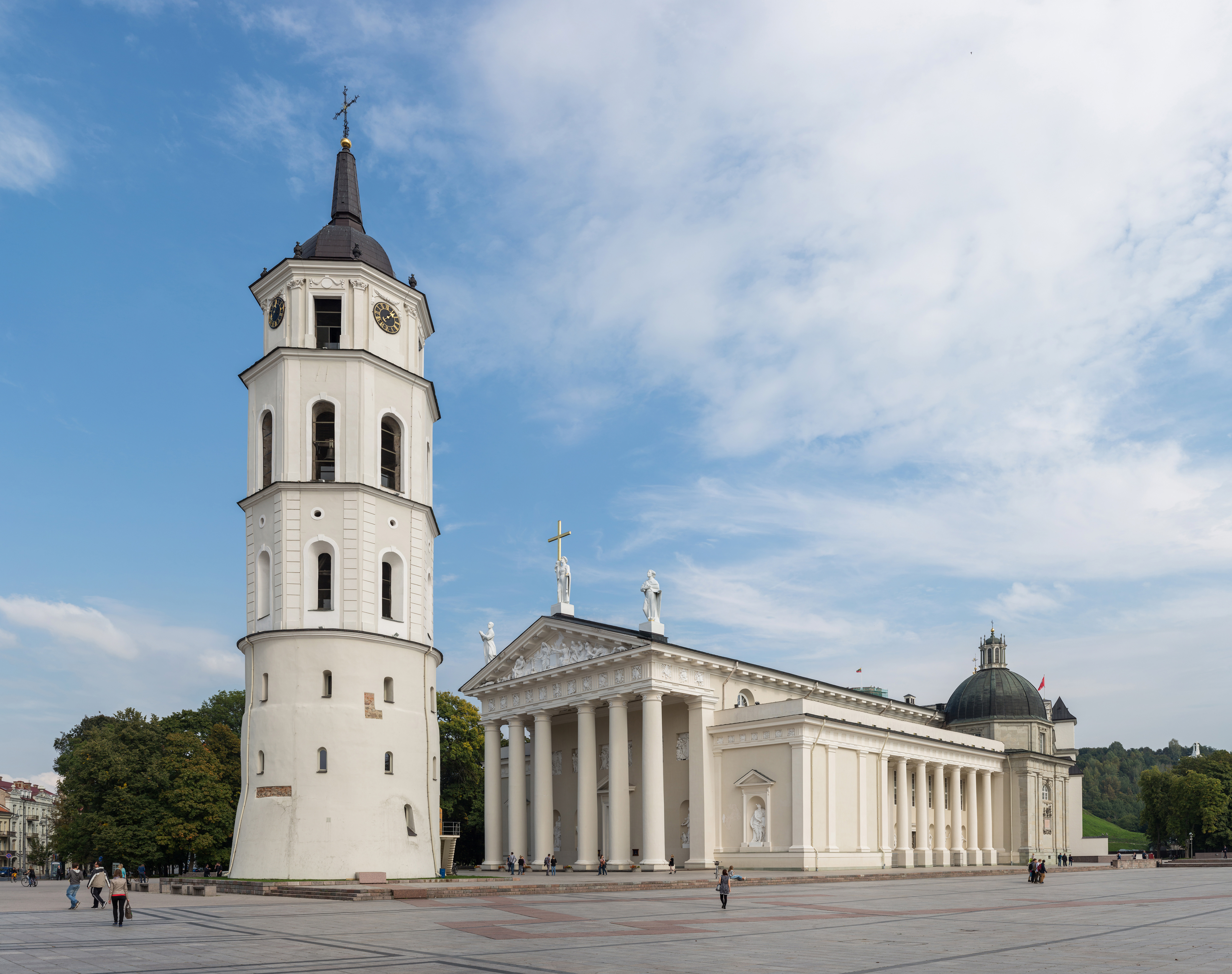
Cathedral and its bell tower

The Cathedral Square in Vilnius (Lithuanian: Katedros aikštė) is the main square of the Vilnius Old Town, right in front of the neo-classical Vilnius Cathedral. It is a key location in city's public life, situated as it is at the crossing of the city's main streets and reflecting the city's diversity. Regularly held at this site are fairs and gatherings of townspeople, military parades, religious and official public events, attractions and large concerts, New Year's salutes and exhibitions. It is not merely the most lively and important location in the city, but is also one of the most significant and widely known symbols of Lithuania.

== Details ==
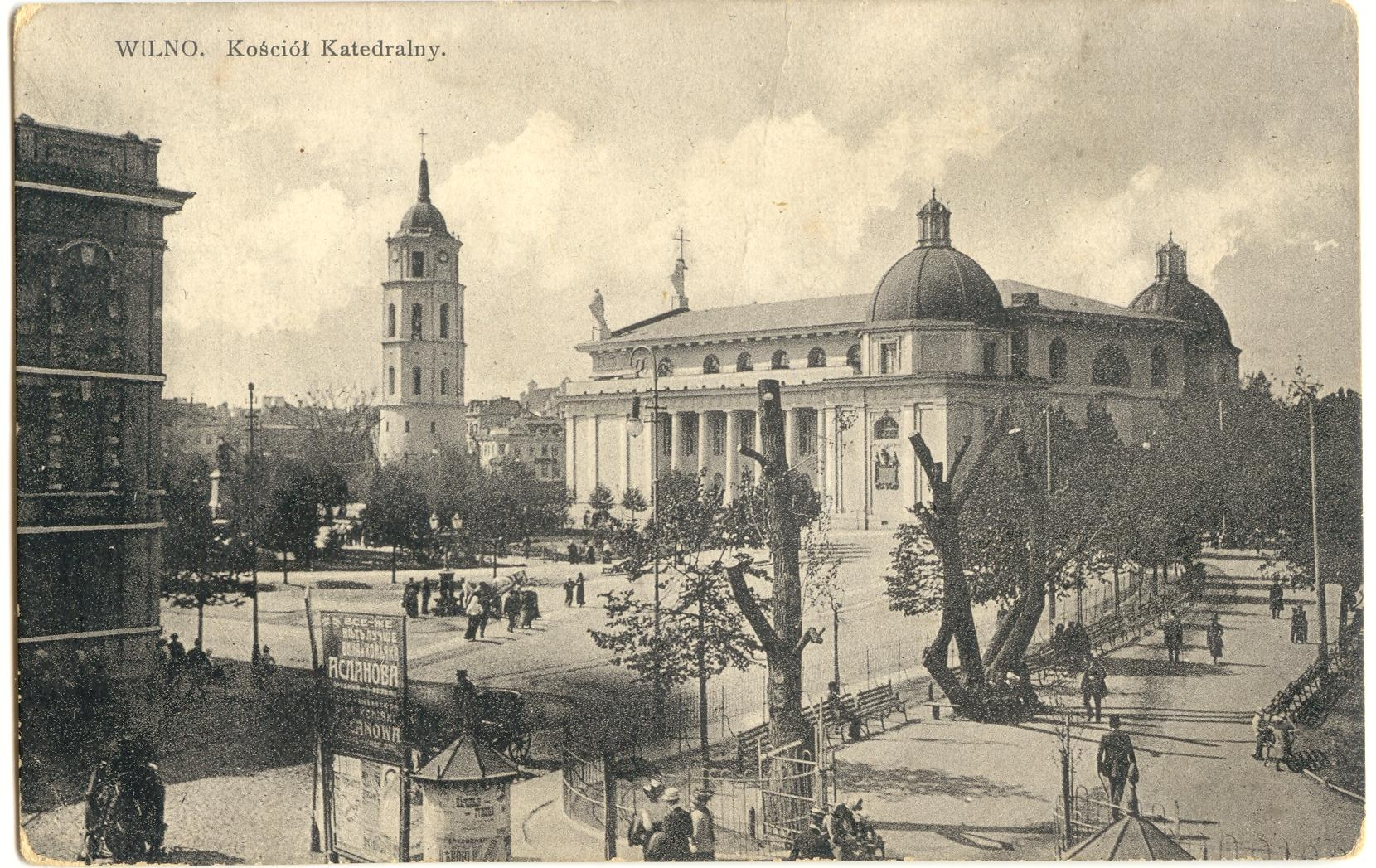
Pre-war view of the square

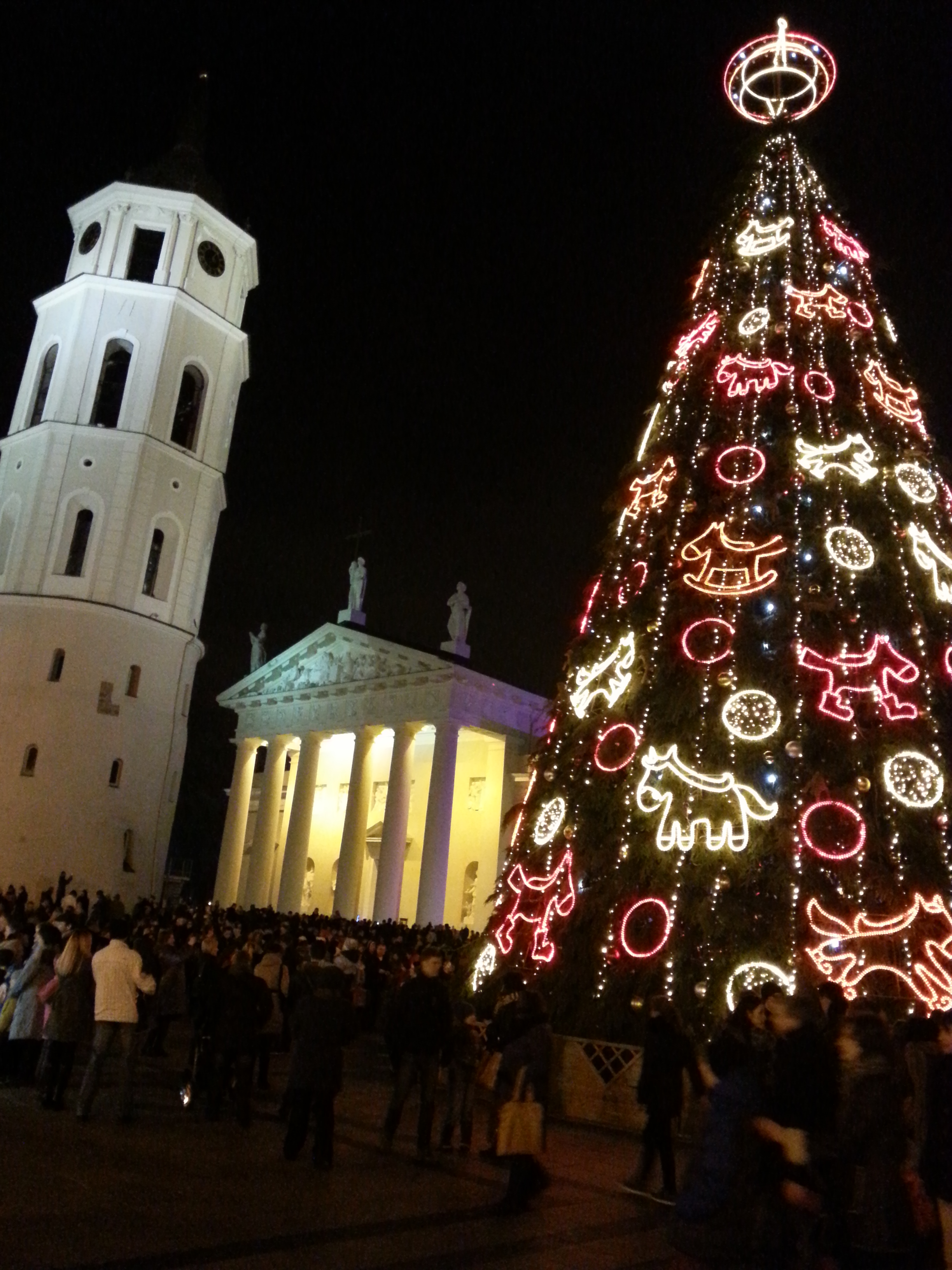
Vilnius Cathedral Square in winter

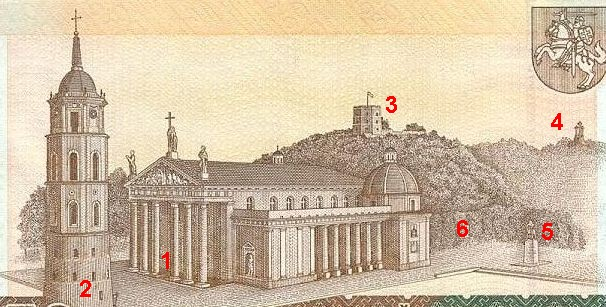
Layout of the square as depicted on 50 litas banknotes. Marked in numbers: 1. Vilnius Cathedral 2. Cathedral's Belfry 3. Gediminas Tower 4. Hill of Three Crosses 5. Monument to Grand Duke Gediminas 6. Location where Royal Palace is being reconstructed. So the view is somewhat outdated

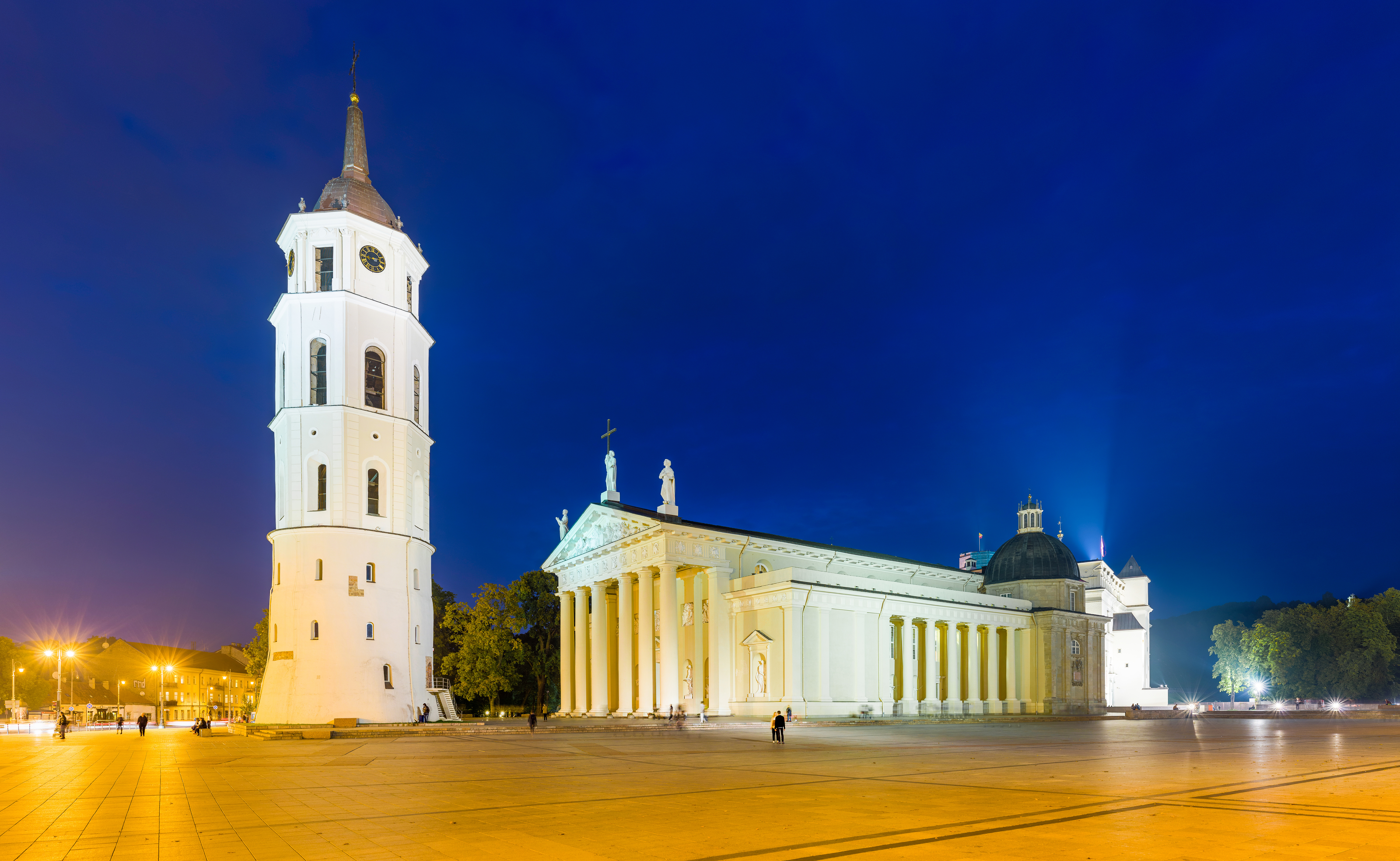
Vilnius Cathedral Square at night

The cathedral square was founded as late as 19th century, during the reconstruction and refurbishment of the cathedral. Previously, the area was densely populated and built up with medieval and renaissance houses. Parts of the area were also occupied by the Lower Castle. Following the creation of a new square it became the main open space of the city's centre. It was there that the Russian military parades were held and where the annual St. Casimir's Fair was held. In 1905 a monument to Catherine the Great (by Mark Antokolski) was erected. After the city was occupied by Germany in 1915 and the local Polish administration was allowed to govern the city, the monument was destroyed and the St. Casimir's Fair was moved to the Łukiszki Square (Lukiškės Square). In modern times, fairs and festivities are regularly held at the site. It is there that the tallest Christmas tree in the city is erected, as well as a number of other Christmas decorations, including outdoor nativity scenes. It is also there that the yearly public celebrations of New Year's Eve are held.

One of the most distinctive features of the square is the cathedral's bell tower, situated several yards from the cathedral itself, a thing uncommon outside of Italy. According to many scholars, the tower was in fact one of the towers of the ancient city walls of the mediaeval Lower Castle that once stood near the modern square. According to another version, not supported by modern historians, the base of the tower was in fact a small pagan temple, demolished and then turned into the bell tower. Regardless of its origins, the lower parts of the tower are mediaeval, with several small loop-holes preserved. Its oldest underground square section was built in the 13th century on the bottom of the old riverbed. Upper parts of the tower were added in the 18th century while the neo-classical finish was added in the 19th century, during the reconstruction of the cathedral.

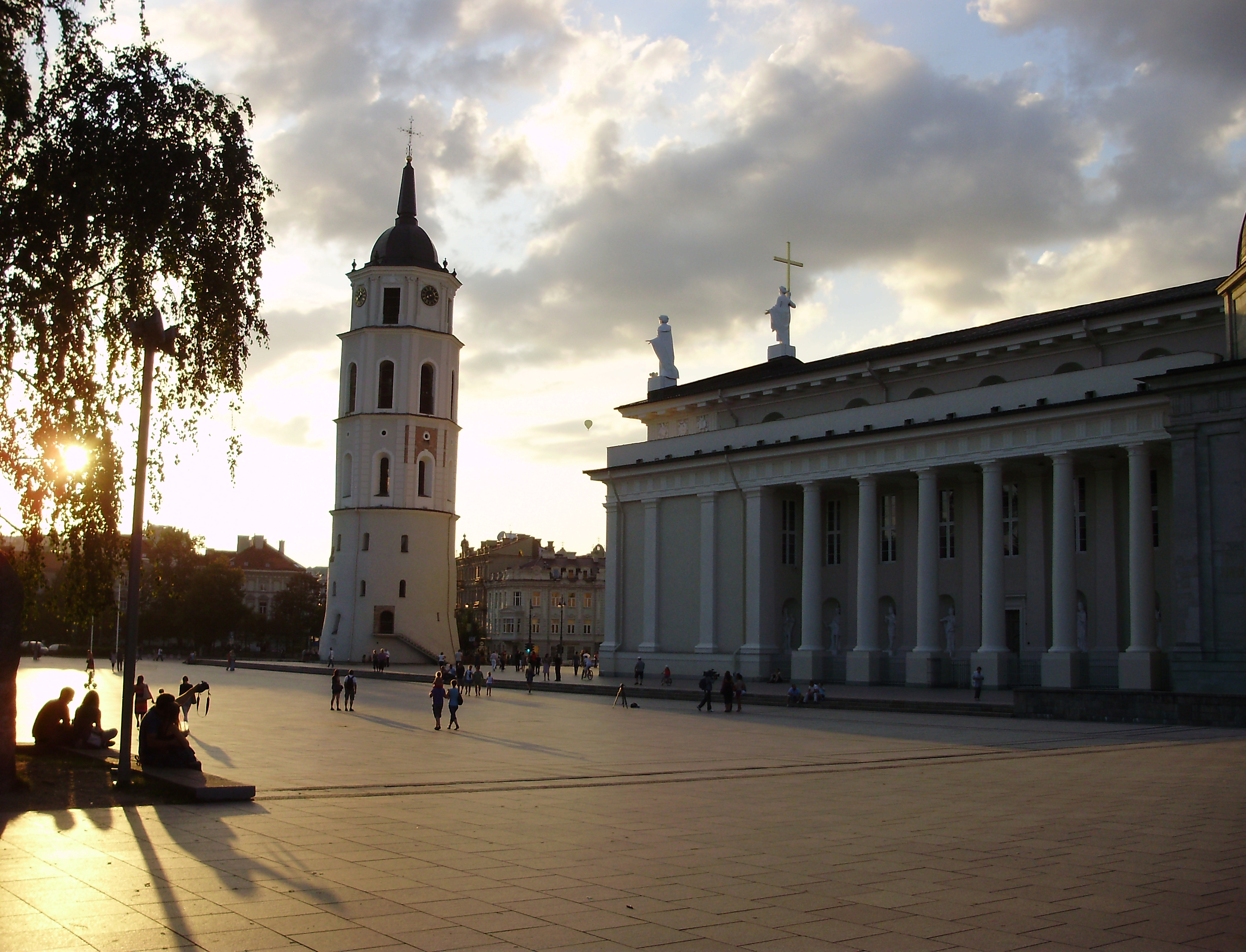
Gediminas's Bell Tower in a summer's evening

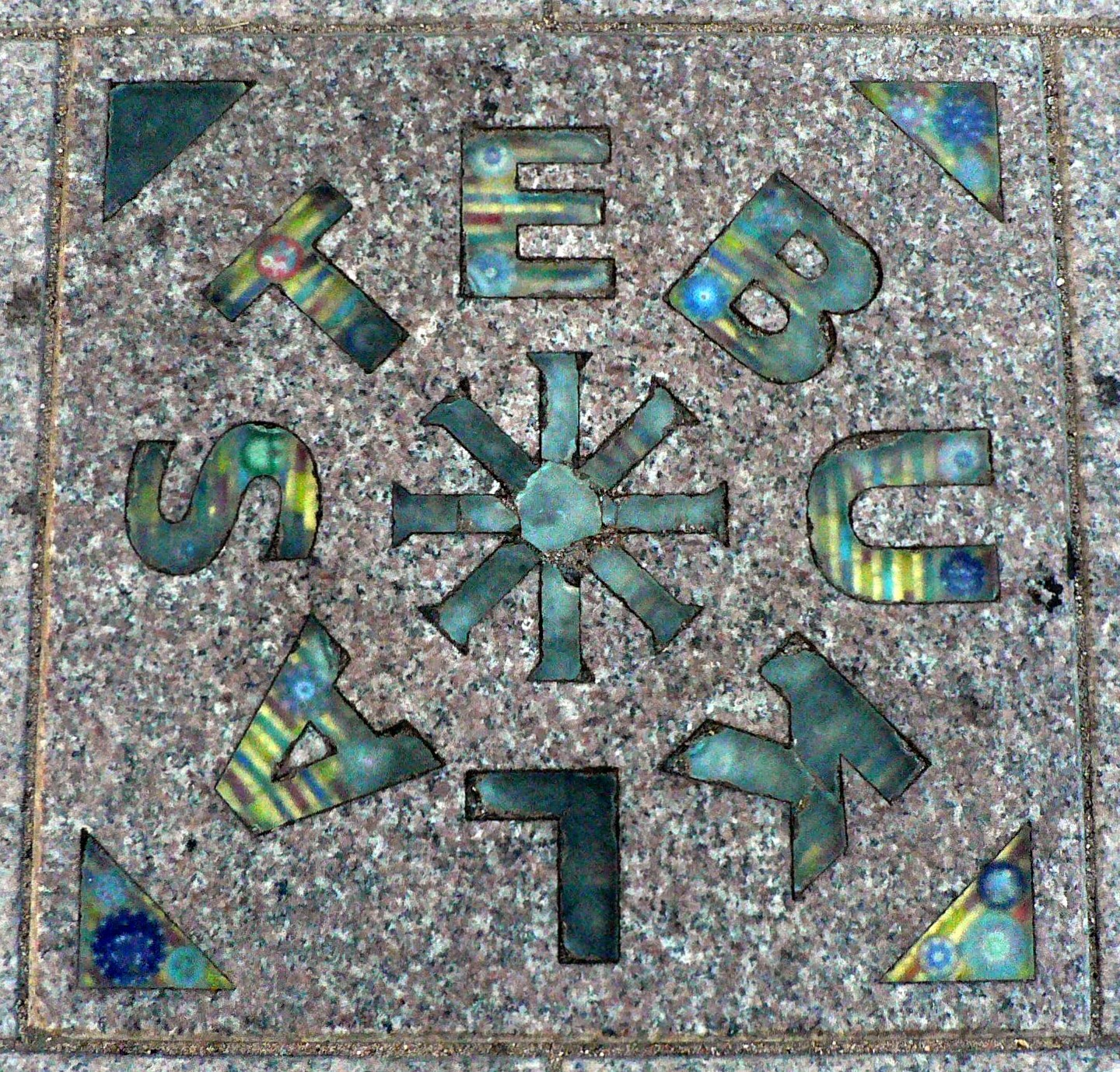
The "Magical Stone." The letters form a word stebuklas (using only one letter for the first and the last S) or a miracle in Lithuanian

Another notable feature of the square is the monument to Gediminas, one of the first rulers of Lithuania, by Vytautas Kašuba, uncovered in 1996. The bronze used for the monument was donated by Lithuanian border guards who confiscated it on the border. The marble pedestal was a gift from the government of Ukraine, while the sculpture itself was cast free of charge in Tallinn. Nearby is a magical place, a small stone marking the place where, according to a local urban legend, the human chain of Baltic Way was started linking Vilnius with Riga and Tallinn, an event that marked the beginning of national liberation of the Baltic States. It is said that if a person steps on this stone and turns around three times, their wish will be granted. Additionally, a footprint tile is found at the location.

The paving of the square was extensively renovated in 2000. The new tiles were made of light granite. Excavated remains of former fortifications of the Lower Castle have been highlighted in the paving by using red-coloured granite.

== Sources ==
- Jadwiga Rogoża; Jarosław Swajdo; Marzena Daszewska (2003). Wilno; barok z kamienia i obłoków. Kraków: Bezdroża. p. 192. ISBN 83-916762-8-5.
