= Easter palm =

Traditional Easter bundle

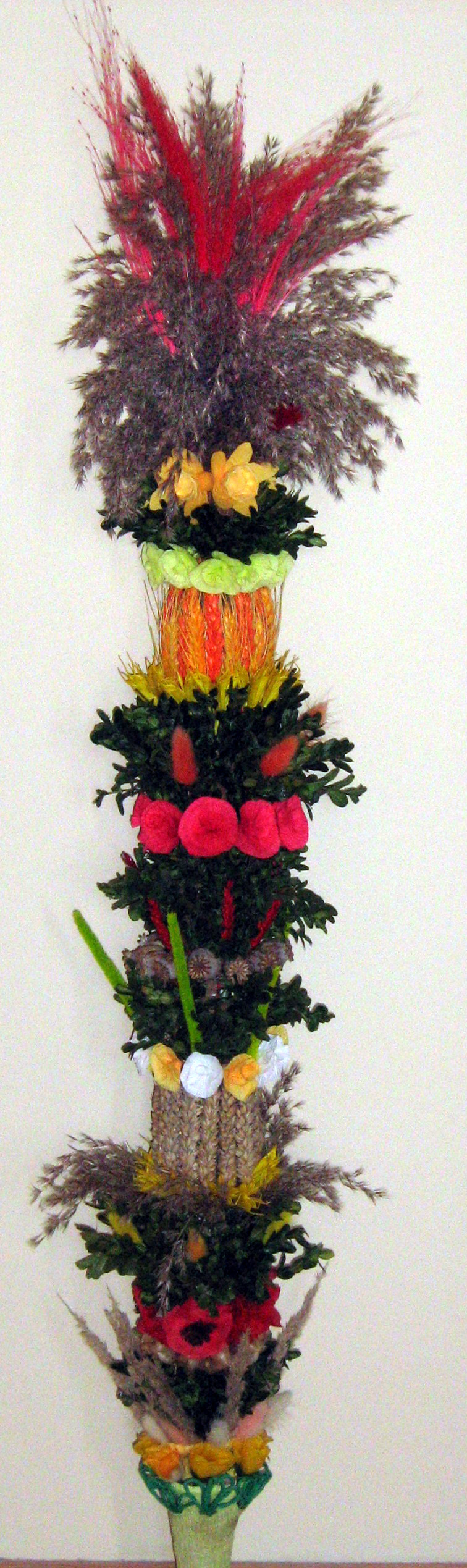
Easter palm

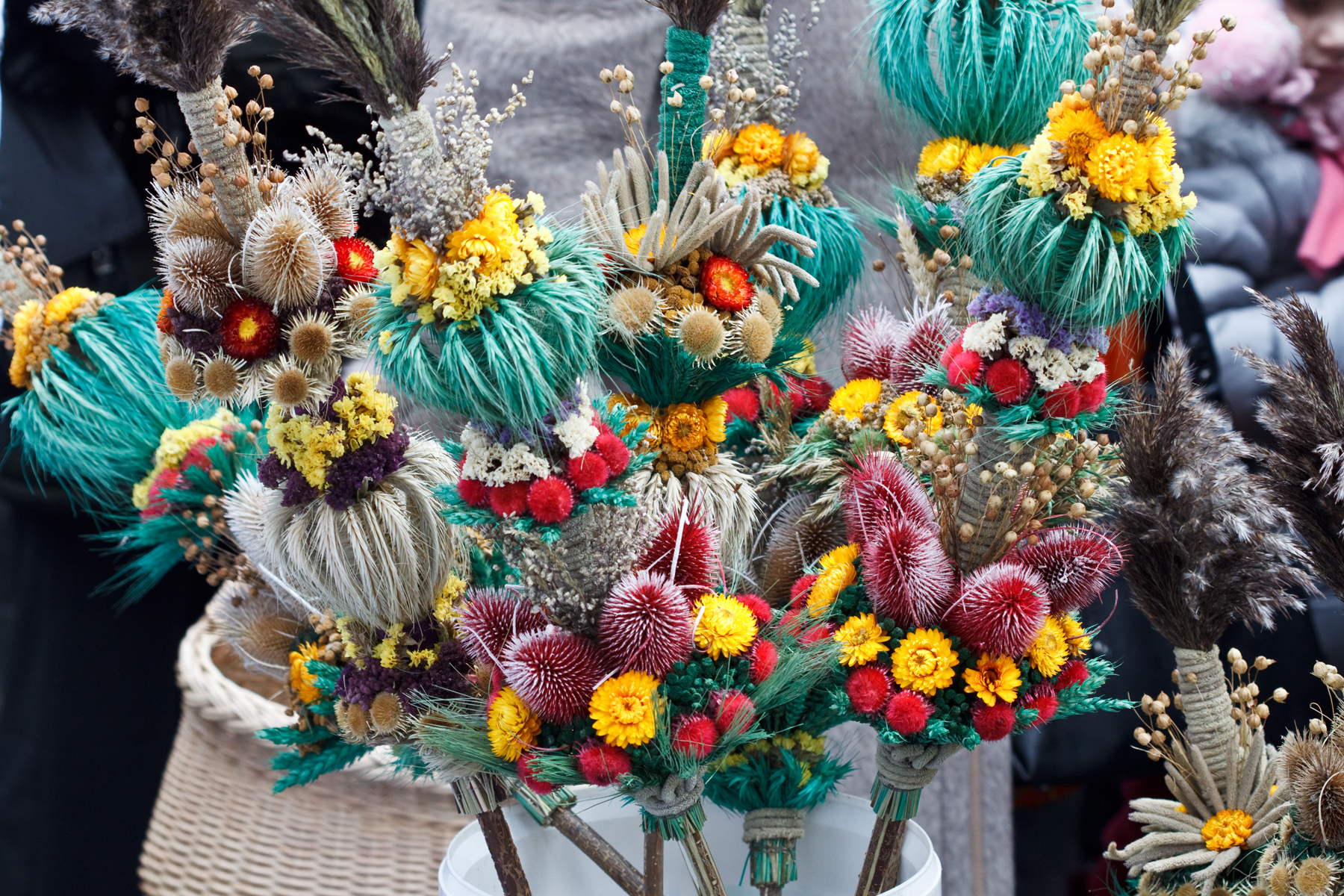
Lithuanian variant of Easter palms (verbos; singular: verba) in Kaziukas Fair, Vilnius

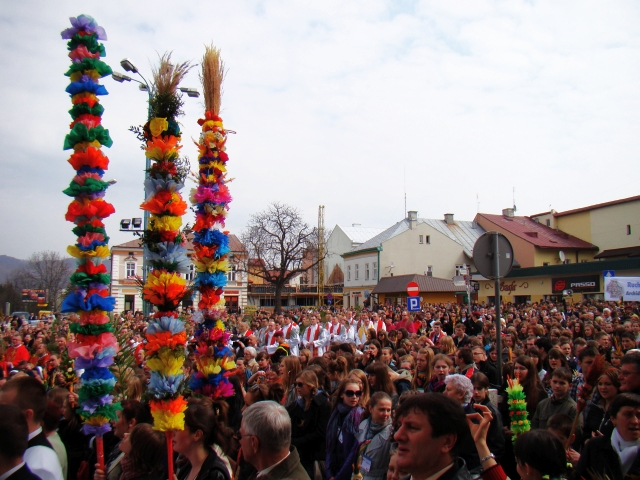
Palm Sunday in Sanok

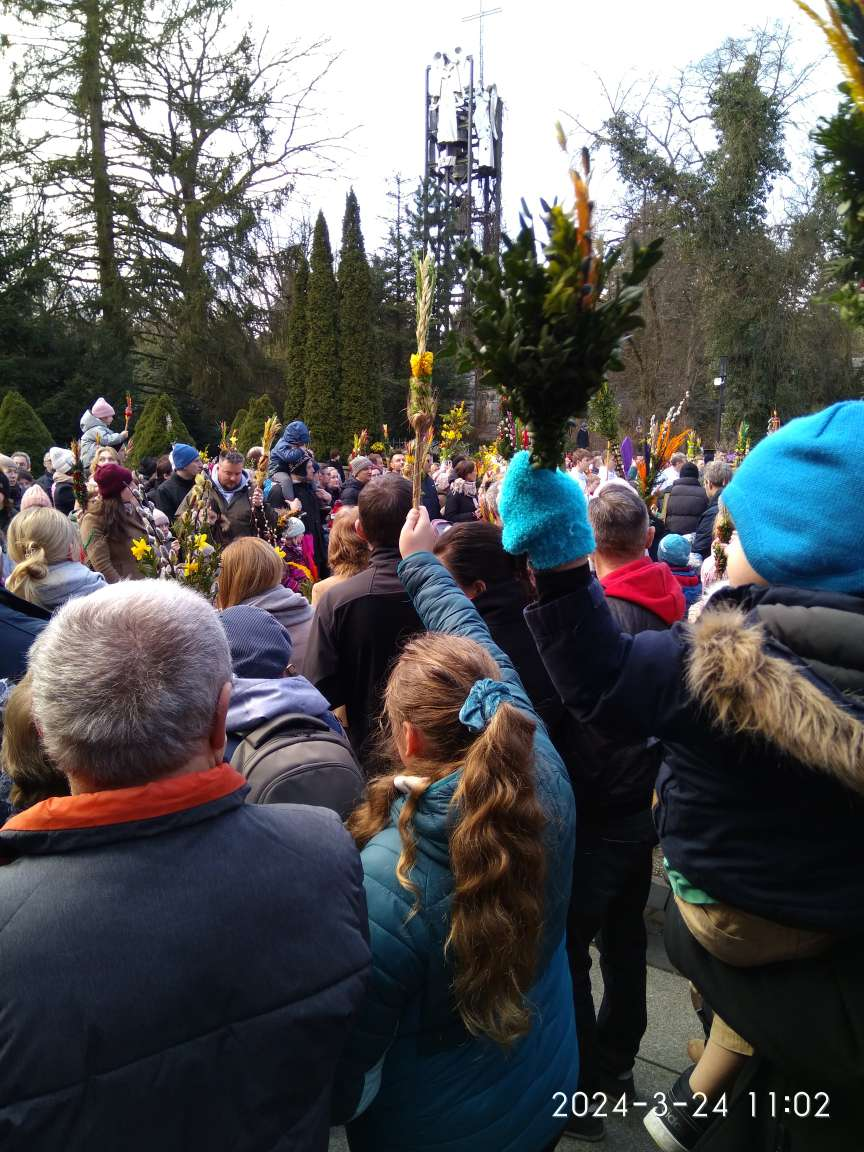
The Solemnity of Blessing of the Easter Palms, Podkowa Lesna, Poland, 24 March 2024

An Easter palm (Polish: palma wielkanocna, [ˈpal.ma ˌvʲi̯ɛl.kaˈnɔt͡s.na]; Lithuanian: verba, [ˈvɛr.bɐ]) is a traditional Lithuanian and Polish symbolic decoration associated with Palm Sunday. Barbara Ogrodowska states that the ceremonial palm branch is the "most important attribute" of Palm Sunday in Poland. Communities of Polish emigrants, such as those in the United States, observe the tradition of making of Easter palms as well.

== History, appearance and composition ==
Traditionally, Easter palms are prepared on Ash Wednesday, from willow branches (with catkins). As palm trees are not indigenous to Poland, willow branches serve as symbolic substitutes for palm branches. An Easter palm may also sport some decorations, such as ribbons or dried flowers or other plants, with attributed beneficial effects.

Traditional Lithuanian verba usually is made out of juniper branch, with the exception of traditional verba of Vilnius region. Lithuanian term for 'verba' was first mentioned in the 1573 Wolfenbüttel Postil – the oldest known postil (manuscript) written in the Lithuanian language by priest Jonas Bylaukis (1540–1603), from Lithuania Minor. In eastern part of Aukštaitija ethnographic region verba is usually adorned with branches of birch or willow, and in Southern Lithuania they would also be decorated with paper flowers. Verba tied in such way was linked not only with religious practices, but also superstitions: if verba was to be tied with red thread, it was believed that during the hay mow the villagers would not experience lower back pain if they would tie the same red verba thread under their belt. Verba would also be placed outside to guard crops from drought, hail or roden. Verba was placed inside the house or fumigated inside in order to protect the house from lightning or other emergencies, and to keep those living in the house healthy. Verbos were also fumigated on livestock, then animals would be pastured in the fields for the very first time in the spring for protection. Verba was also placed in beehive in order to keep the bees healthy and alive. Verba would be grinded and placed into the first portion of sow in order for the crops to grow healthy and fruitful. The tradition has developed and become transmitted from generation to generation (in some particular cases even lasting seven generations of practitioners) in villages of North West of Vilnius city. The first iconographic records of the tying of verbos can be traced to the middle of the 19th century, because the iconic painting “Lithuanian girl with verbos” by Kanutas Ruseckas, painted in 1847, has inadvertently recorded this tradition, as well as the description by ethnographer Oscar Kolberg in 1866 and other sources.

In the early 20th century, around Vilnius (Polish: Wilno, now in Lithuania, but between the wars part of Poland), decorations made to resemble palm trees began to be sold on Palm Sunday each year. Rarely more than 0.5 metres (1 ft 8 in) long, the Easter palms soon became popular throughout Poland, and were exported to France in significant quantities as well. It is possible that the Easter palm was originally designed by Polish interwar artist Ferdynand Ruszczyc; further historical research is needed.

Easter palms may reach as high as 10 metres (33 ft). In the 2011 edition of an Easter palm competition that has been held yearly since 1958, one entry reportedly topped 36 metres (118 ft), making it the tallest Easter palm on record.

There are many regional variations between Easter palms in Poland. In the south of the country, willow branches of various lengths are tied together, sometimes with hazel branches or wicker as well, and topped with a large flower bouquet and other decorations, including a golden cross. In the Kurpie region, the entire length of the Easter palm is often decorated with flowers. The Ethnographic Museum of Kraków holds over 200 Easter palms in its collection.

The craft of Easter palm binding is becoming endangered in Lithuania. It is a tedious and time-consuming process. It is becoming increasingly difficult to find flowers and herbs (a very large number of varieties are used in a single verba) or special dies to color them. The buyers are wary that the dried plants would cause allergic reactions and verba binders suffer from allergic reactions themselves.

== Cultural significance ==
Easter palms are an important feature of Polish Easter celebrations. They are consecrated in a church, and subsequently paraded. Some regional customs include using the palms to sprinkle water in a house, feeding them to animals, using them as decorations for religious paintings, and burning them and using the ash in Ash Wednesday ceremonies the next year. Easter palms were said to bring about a good harvest when "planted" in a field.

As with some Christian symbols and traditions, the Easter palm's origin can be traced to pagan religions which held the willow to be endowed with beneficial qualities, and to symbolize enduring life, and rebirth. In time, the willow was adopted as a symbol by Christians in Poland.

In 2019 the Tradition of tying verbos (Easter palms) in Vilnius region was inscribed into The Intangible Cultural Heritage Inventory of Lithuania as a form of folk art, traditional craftsmanship or agricultural activities. Post Second World War verbos of Vilnius city and Vilnius region became a staple of both the Easter Holiday and traditional Kaziuko mugė (Saint Casimir's Fair). However, verbos are becoming used as a souvenir at many other fairs in Lithuania and abroad, at song celebrations and festivals, they are also showcased at various exhibitions.

== Gallery ==
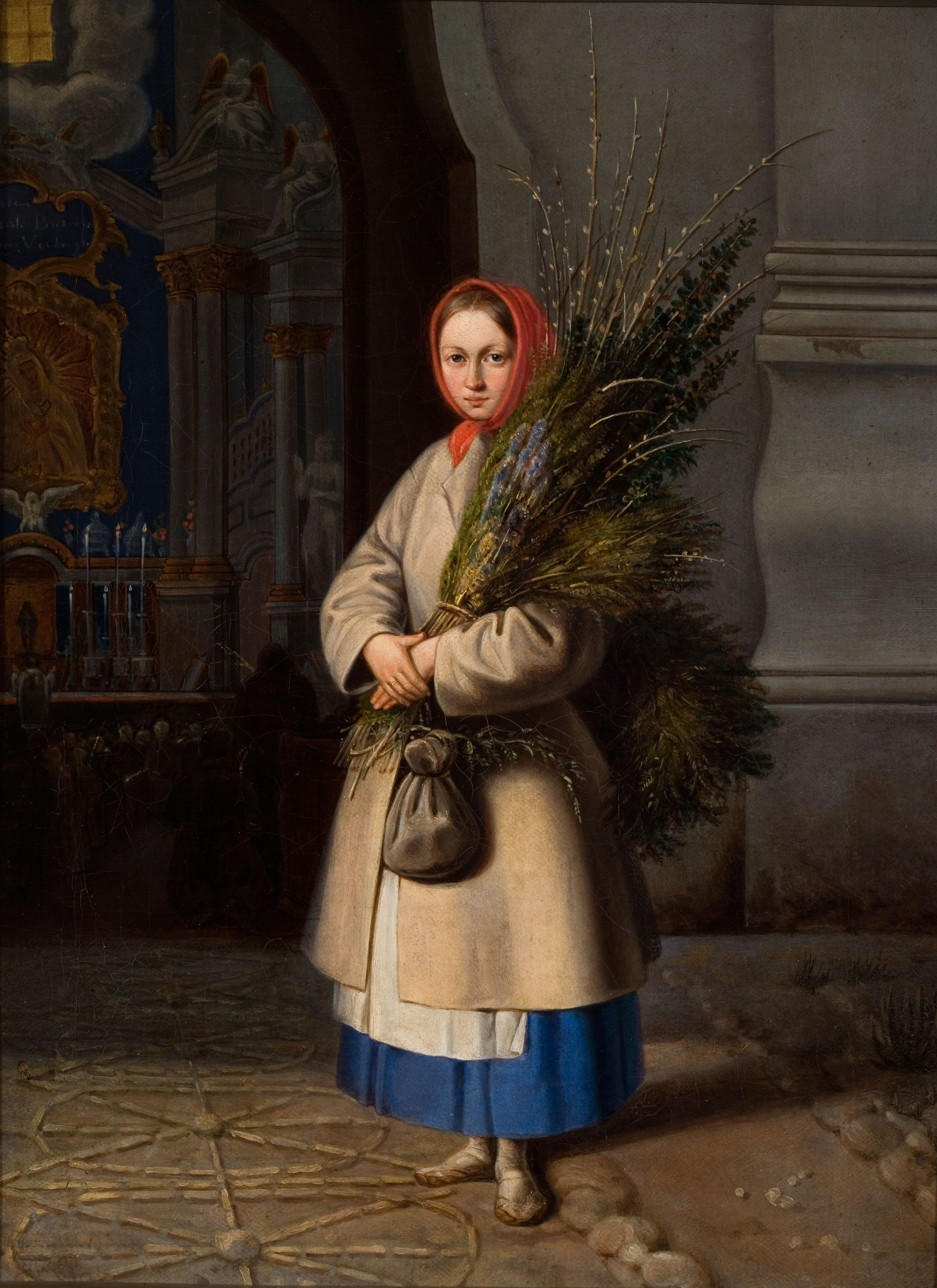
Kanutas Ruseckas – Lithuanian Girl with Verbos, 1847

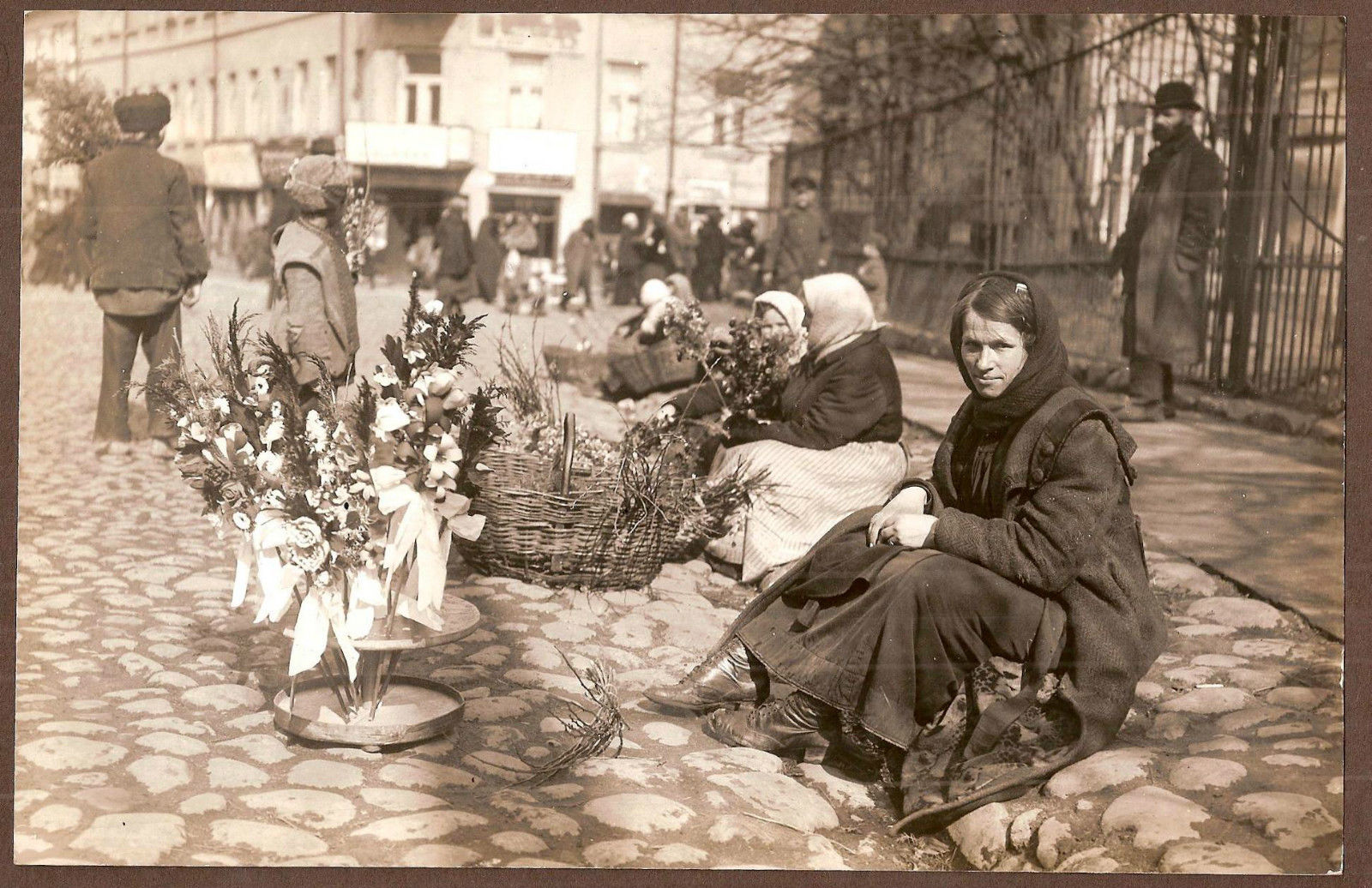
A woman selling her verbos in Vilnius, 1916

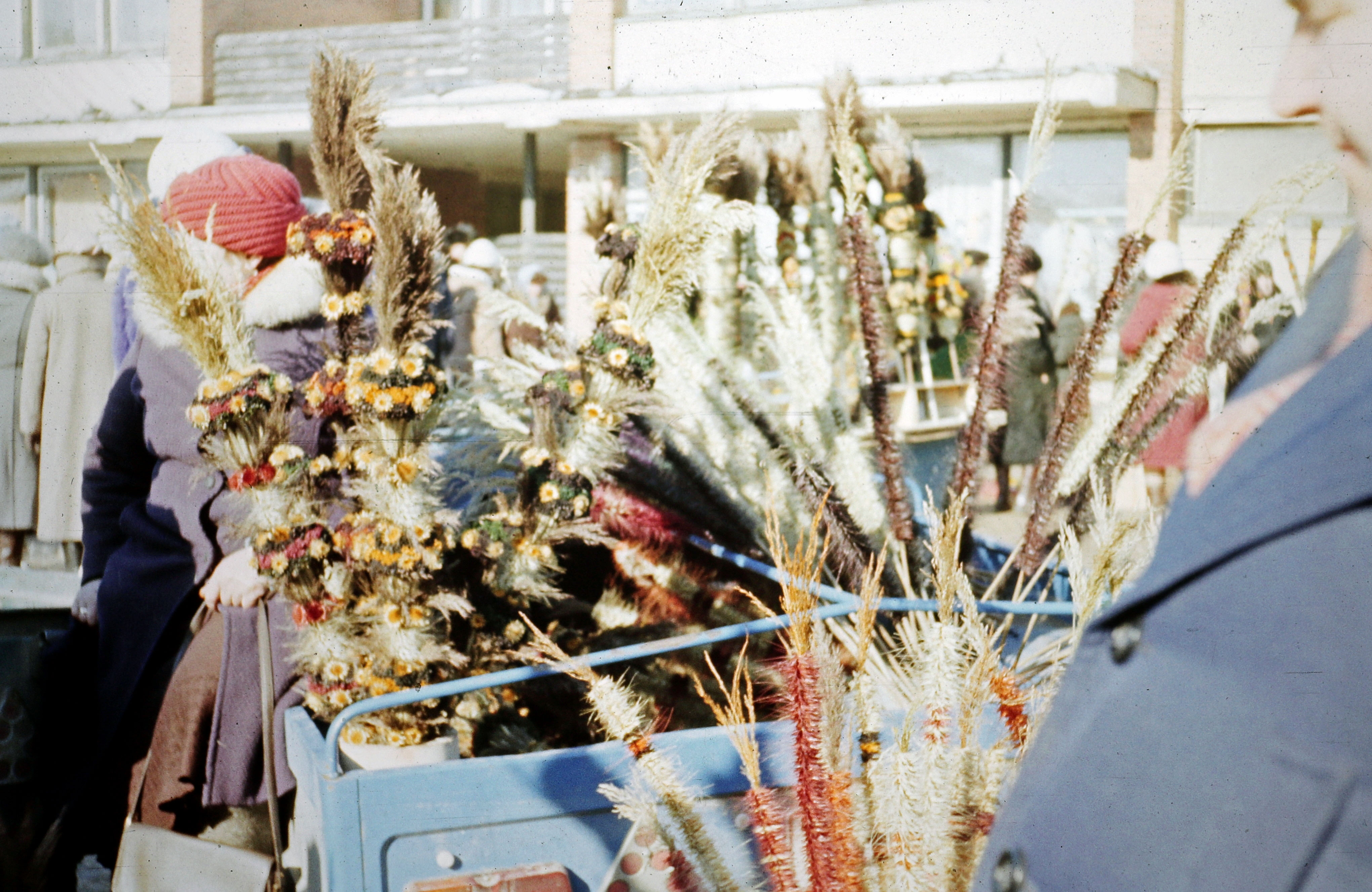
Verbos, offered for sale during the Kaziuko mugė in 1983

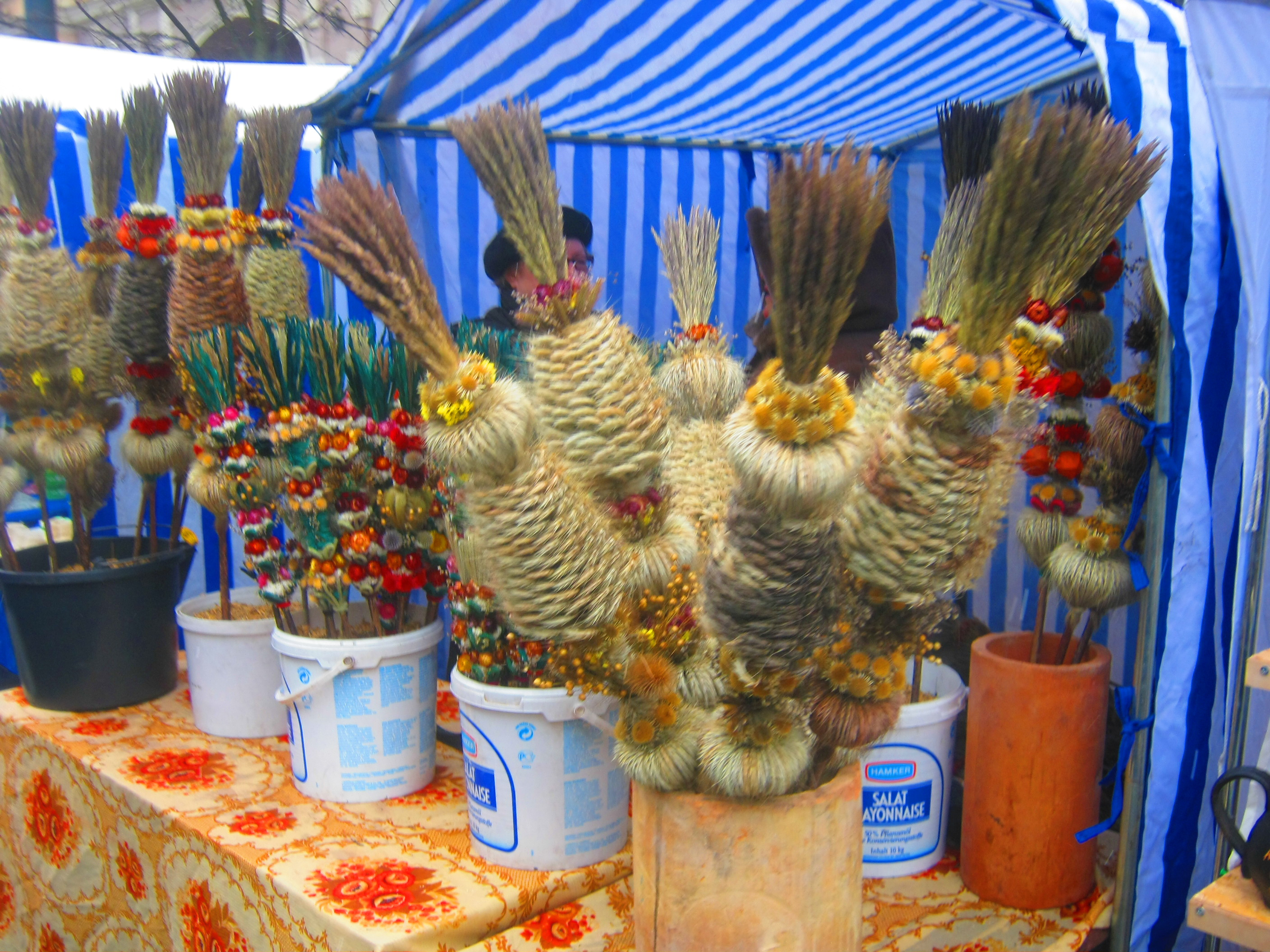
Verbos, offered for sale during the Kaziuko mugė in 2013

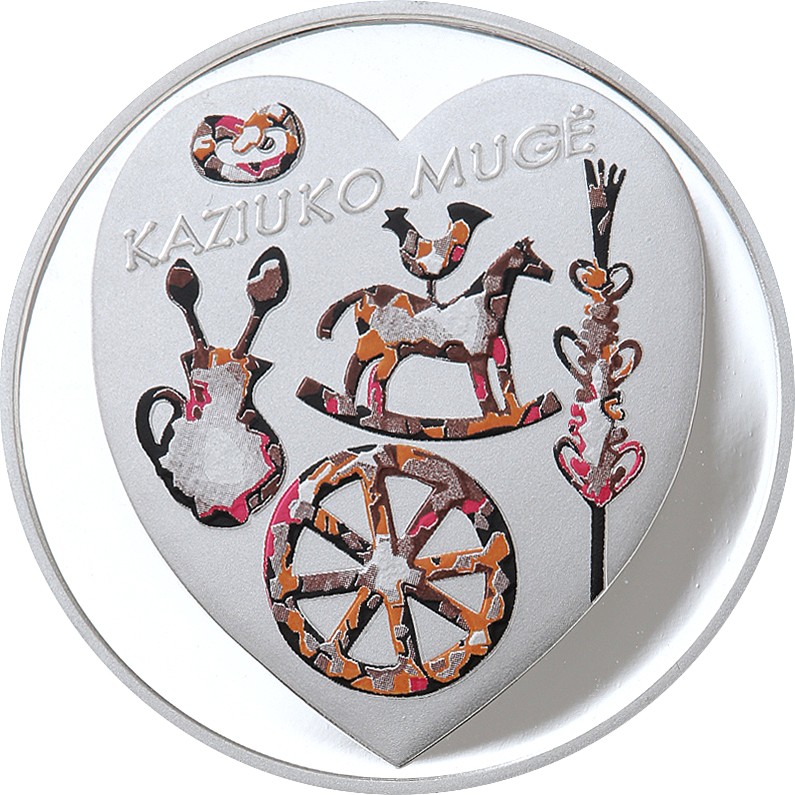
2017 Lithuanian collector's 5 euro coin, dedicated to Kaziuko mugė with depiction of verba

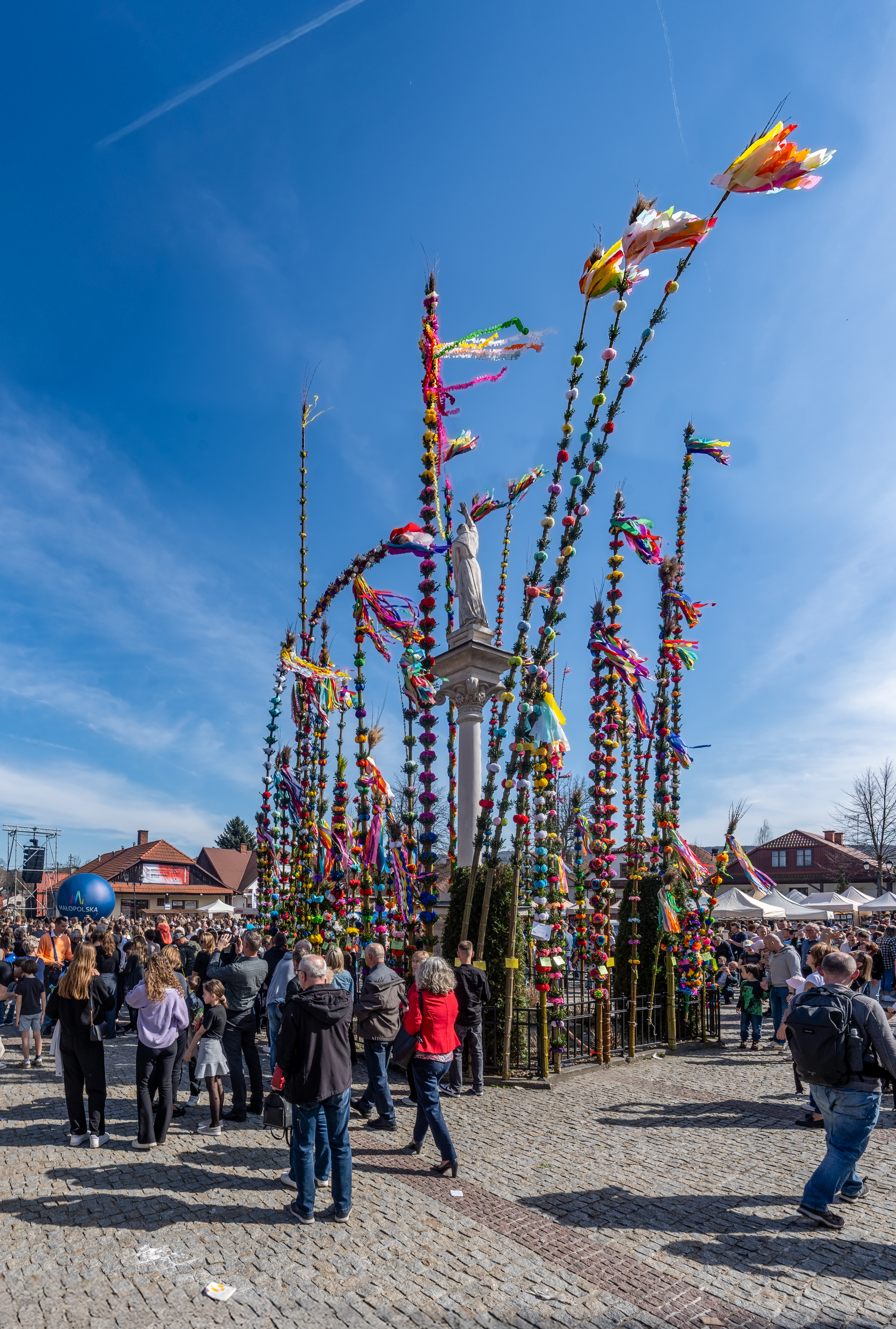
Lipnica Murowana, Poland, Palm Sunday 2025, competition of the largest Easter palms

== See also ==
- Pisanka
- Święconka
- Śmigus-Dyngus
