= Žemaitkiemis =

- Town
- The Church of St. Casimir

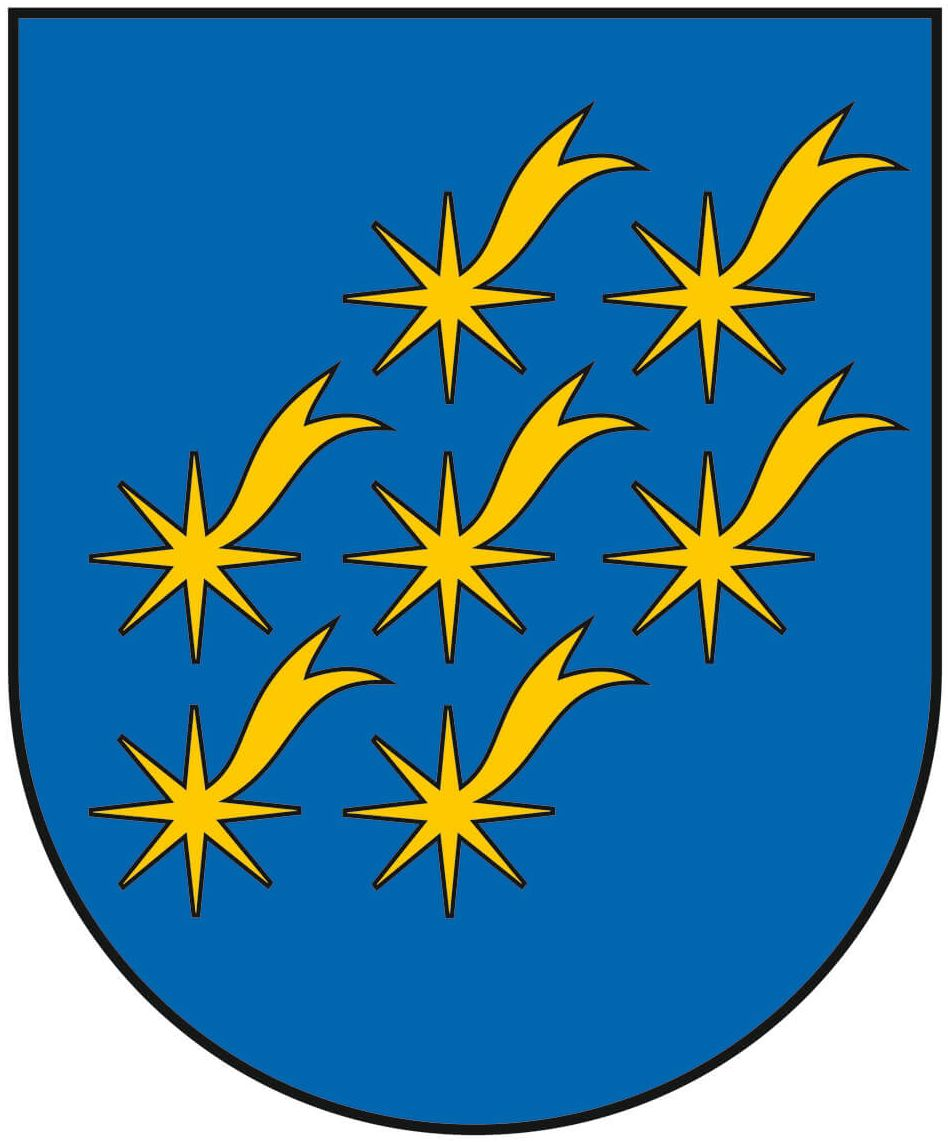
- Coat of arms

- Location of Žemaitkiemis
- Coordinates: 55°18′20″N 24°58′40″E
- Country: Lithuania
- Ethnographic region: Aukštaitija
- County: Vilnius County
- Municipality: Ukmergė district municipality
- Eldership: Žemaitkiemis eldership
- Capital of: Žemaitkiemis eldership

Population (2011)
  - Total: 261
- Time zone: UTC+2 (EET)
  - Summer (DST): UTC+3 (EEST)

Žemaitkiemis (literally: Garden of Samogitians) is a town in Ukmergė district, Lithuania. It is located 17 kilometres (11 mi) north-east of Ukmergė. The Neo-Baroque Church of Saint Casimir was built in 1902. According to the 2011 census, the town has a population of 261 people.

== History ==
In 1586, Garcia Alabiano, Rector of Jesuit Academy of Vilnius, founded the Church of St. Casimir in Žemaitkiemis, which was completed in 1586 and was the first church dedicated to Saint Casimir, however this wooden church was not preserved and it was later rebuilt as other wooden and masonry churches, the latest version of this church was constructed between 1899–1902.

The town's coat of arms, adopted in 2017, features the Žemaitkiemis meteorite that fell near the town in 1933.
