= Kaziuko mugė =

Arts festival in Lithuania

Coordinates: 54°41′7″N 25°17′12″E

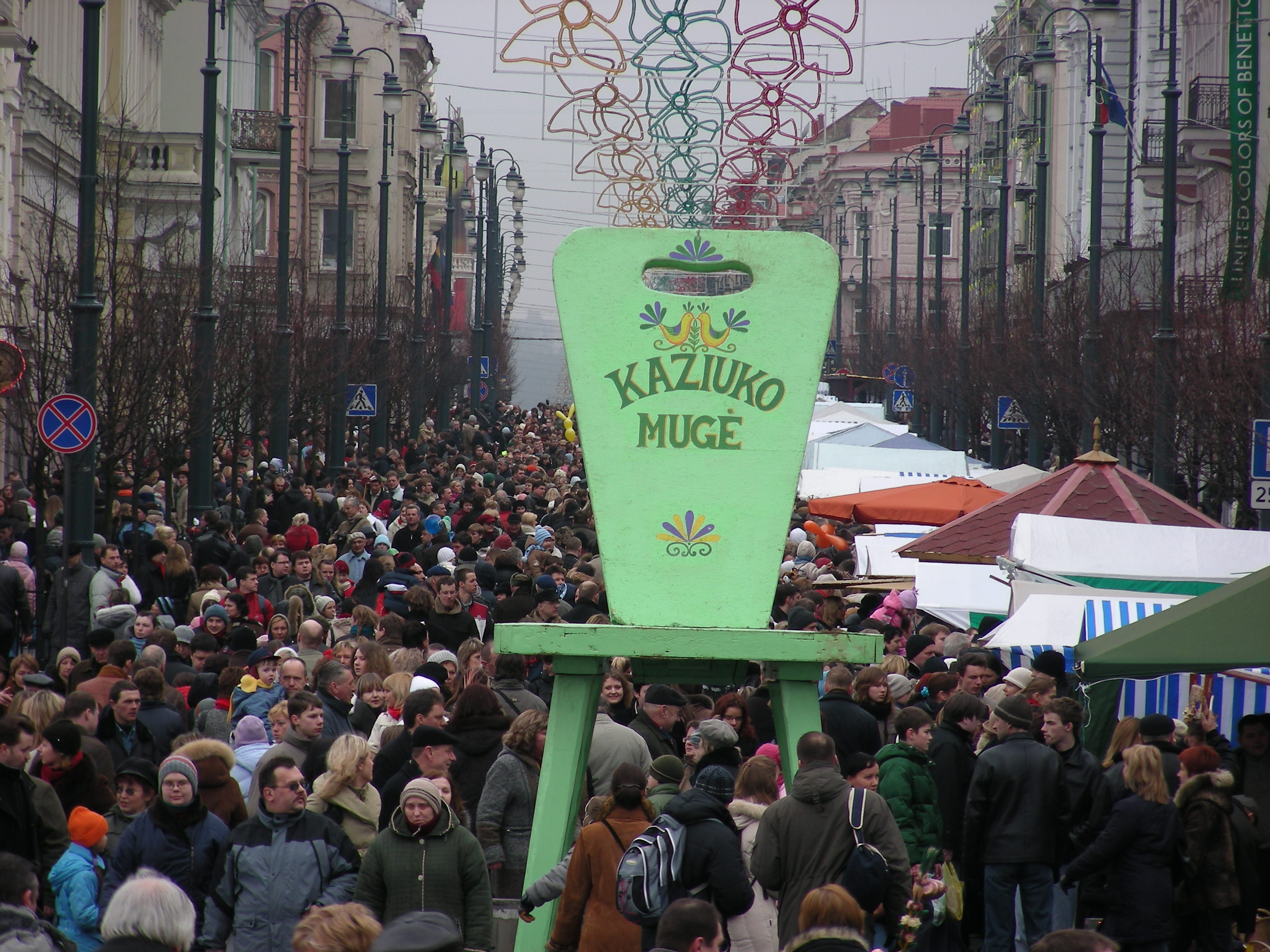
Crowds in Kaziukas' Fair in 2007

Kaziuko mugė or Saint Casimir's Fair is a large annual folk arts and crafts fair in Lithuania, dating to the beginning of the 17th century. The fair is traditionally held in city's markets and streets on the Sunday nearest to 4 March (Feast of St. Casimir), the anniversary of Saint Casimir's death. In Lithuanian, Kaziukas is a diminutive of Casimir. Today, Saint Casimir's fair also features music, dance, theater performances; it attracts tens of thousands of visitors and many craftsmen from across Lithuania as well as from neighbouring countries such as Latvia, Estonia, and Poland. In recent years, the fair has expanded into other cities in Lithuania, Belarus, Poland.

== History and location ==
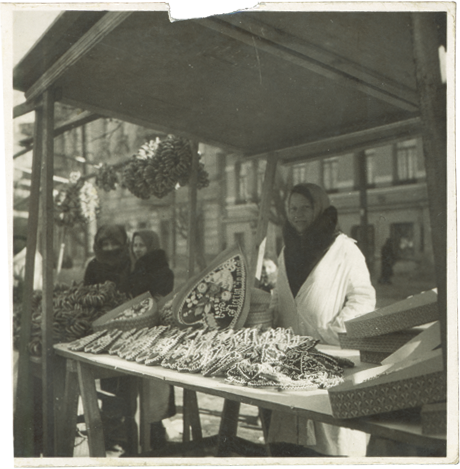
Vendor of Casimir's Hearts in 1939

St. Casimir, son of King of Poland and Grand Duke of Lithuania Casimir IV, was canonized in 1602. In conjunction with his feast day celebrations, merchants established a fair. In 1827, they received a privilege to hold the fair in the Cathedral Square. In 1901, after a monument to Catherine the Great was unveiled in the Cathedral Square, the fair was moved to Lukiškės Square. During the Soviet era, the fair was held in Kalvarijos Market. In 1991, it returned to the Old Town of Vilnius. It was first held in Pilies Street but has since grown to span Gediminas Avenue, traverse the Cathedral Square, and branch out into Pilies Street, B. Radvilaitės Street, passing St. Anne's Church, and the Orthodox Cathedral of the Theotokos, and into the Tymas' Quarter on the left bank of Vilnia River near Užupis. It is estimated that as of 2013, the fair attracted 2,000 merchants and half a million visitors over three days (Friday to Sunday). In 2021, due to the COVID-19 pandemic, the fair was held online. Previously, the fair did not take place only during World War II.

In recent years the fair has expanded into other cities in Lithuania, including Kaunas (in Laisvės alėja and Town Hall Square), Alytus, Klaipėda. Similar festivals called Kaziuki are also held in several cities in Poland, e.g. in Lidzbark Warmiński, Olsztyn, Szczecin, Gdańsk and Poznań, as well as in Hrodna, Belarus, the city where St. Casimir died. A smaller version of the fair is also held by Lithuanian communities abroad, including inside the Lithuanian World Center in Lemont, Illinois.

== Features ==
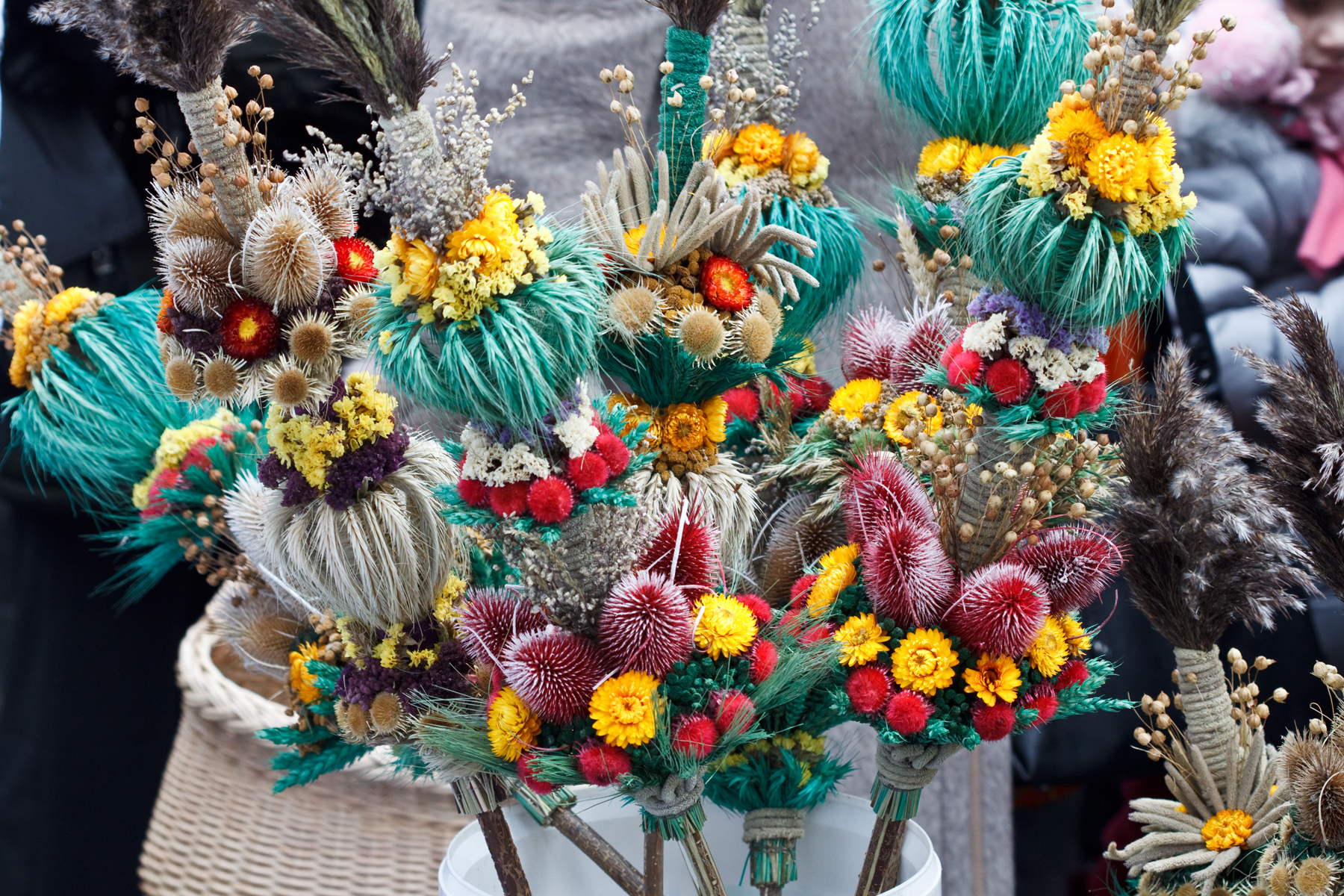
Verbos

The arts and crafts at the fair include hand-made goods from local craftsmen, such as woven and knitted clothes, footwear, toys, utensils, pots and jugs, jewelry, souvenirs, and paintings. Traditional foodstuffs include rye bread, bubliks, gingerbread, natural honey, beer, gira, and colorfully wrapped hard candy. Crafts represented include wood carvers, blacksmiths, potters, weavers and knitters, wicker weavers.

Easter palms (Lithuanian: verbos, singular: verba) are one of the fair's specialties. They are made of colourful dried wild flowers and herbs (about 150 different varieties of plants are used) tied around a wooden stick. Traditionally, they were taken to churches on Palm Sunday. Verba has become a traditional symbol of spring and Easter. However, it is an endangered craft. Making verba is difficult and time-consuming process. It is becoming increasingly difficult to find flowers and herbs or special dies to color them. The buyers are wary that the dried plants would cause allergic reactions.

Another signature product at the fair is the Casimir's Heart, a heart-shaped gingerbread decorated with sugar patterns and figures (flowers, zigzags, birds, etc.) or popular given names. People buy them to give to their loved ones. It is customary to bring back some these to those who could not attend.
