= San Nicola da Tolentino, Palermo =

Church building in Palermo, Italy

San Nicola da Tolentino
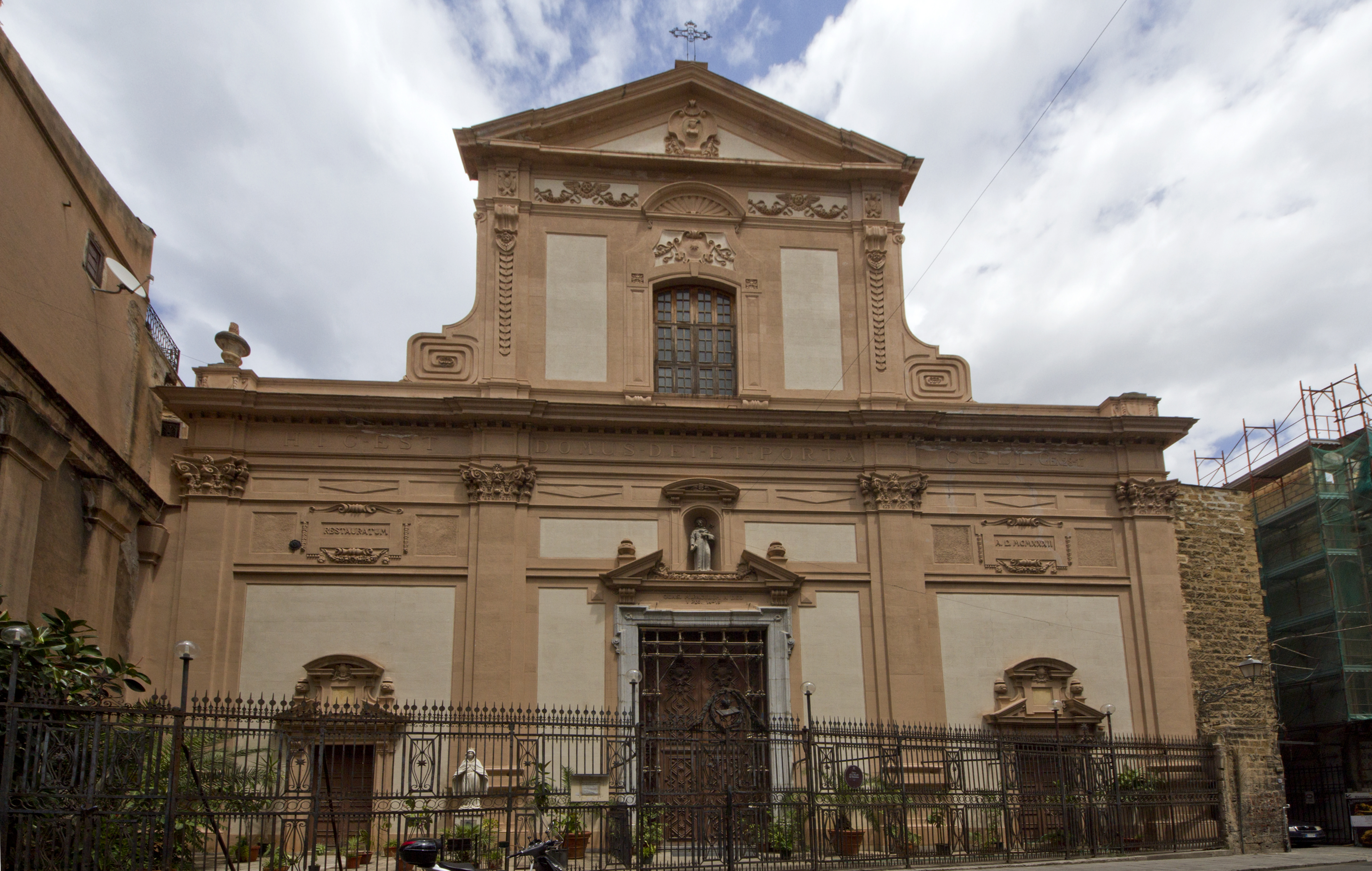
- Facade of the church

Religion
- Affiliation: Roman Catholic
- Province: Archdiocese of Palermo
- Rite: Roman Rite

Location
- Location: Via Maqueda, Palermo, Italy
- Interactive map of San Nicola da Tolentino
- Coordinates: 38.11383°N 13.36276°E

San Nicola da Tolentino, or more in non-dialect known as the church Saint Niccolò da Tolentino, is a Roman Catholic church located on via Maqueda #157, between via dei Calderai and via Giardinaccio, at the Southwest border of the quarter of Kalsa (Tribunali) of the historic centre of Palermo, region of Sicily, Italy.

== History and decoration ==
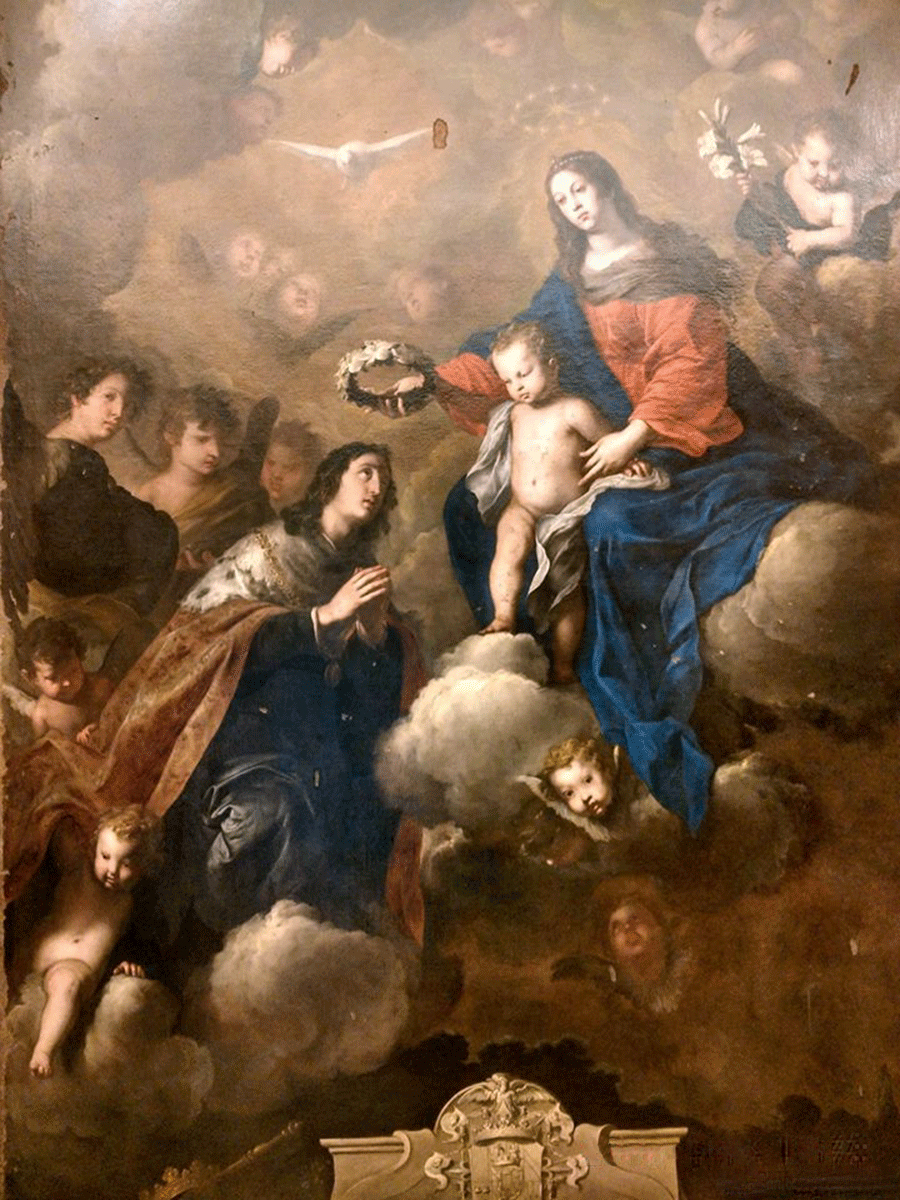
Madonna and Child crowning Saint Casimir by Pietro Novelli

A plaque in the church indicates the site once housed a synagogue. On January 2, 1492, King Ferdinand expelled all the Jews from the lands under the crown of Aragon. On 6 October 1492, the Jewish community sold the site to the Di Salvo family, putatively to cover a debt. In 1507, under the approval of the archbishop of Palermo, Giovanni Paternò, the Clarissan nun, Lucrezia di Leo, obtained the site and adjacent courtyard to found a small monastery called Santa Maria del Popolo. This monastery remained poor in donations and numbers, and in 1579, the remaining nuns were assigned to the convent of Santa Maria di Monte Oliveto. In 1582, the Collegio dei Notai was assigned the monastery's property, but 14 years later transferred the property to the Discalced Augustinians, who ultimately continued construction of a church dedicated to St Niccolò in 1603–1609, but due to damage from earthquakes the church underwent reconstructions in the 17th and 18th-centuries. The Augustinian monastery was felt to be failing to keep their monastic orders, they were moved to Santa Maria della Sanita, and this church became a parish site of worship. In 1824, the church was reconsecrated by Cardinal Pietro Gravina, brother of Federico Gravina.

The statue of San Niccolò da Tolentino in the facade was added in 1687.The facade defines the longitudinal layout of a tall central nave and lower flanking aisles, separated from the nave by pilasters and arches. The nave leads to a crossing transept, with a dome, and lastly to a recessed apse. The lateral aisles open to individual chapels. The first chapel on the right has a 1494 baptismal font with a statue of St John the Baptist derived from the nearby, now demolished church of San Giovanni dei Tartari. In 1874, the parish of this church was assigned to this church. In one of the chapels was buried a Spanish Archbishop of the Fajardo family, an Augustinian prelate, who was captured by Muslims while on route to Sicily. Ransomed, he soon died in 1694. On the left nave, is a canvas depicting the Immaculate Conception by Pietro Novelli.

== San Nicolò alla Kalsa and San Nicolò la Carruba ==
The church of San Nicolò alla Kalsa, also known as dei Latini, was located in Piazza Santo Spirito, near the Porta Felice. The gothic style church was heavily damaged by the 1823 earthquake, fell into ruin, and was razed. There was also in the same quarter a church of San Nicolò la Carruba, pertaining to the Greek community. Only a sliver remains of the church still visible on Via del Quattro Aprile, across the street from the Palazzo Palagonia alla Gancia.
