= Church of St. Casimir, Žemaitkiemis =

Roman Catholic church in Žemaitkiemis, Lithuania built in 1902

Coordinates: 55°18′18.72″N 24°58′34.68″E

Church of St. Casimir
- Šv. Kazimiero bažnyčia (Lithuanian)
- The main façade of the church
- Click on the map for a fullscreen view
- Location: Žemaitkiemis
- Address: S. Morkūno Square 2
- Country: Lithuania
- Denomination: Catholic
- Tradition: Latin Church

History
- Founder: Garcia Alabiano
- Dedication: Saint Casimir
- Consecrated: The first church: 1586; The latest church: 1902

Architecture
- Functional status: Active
- Heritage designation: Inscribed to the Registry of Cultural Property of Lithuania
- Architectural type: Church
- Style: Baroque Revival
- Years built: The first church: ~1586; The latest church: 1899–1902
- Groundbreaking: The first church: 1586; The latest church: 1899
- Completed: The first church: 1586; The latest church: 1902

Specifications
- Materials: Plastered masonry, metal

Administration
- Archdiocese: Roman Catholic Archdiocese of Kaunas

The Church of St. Casimir (Lithuanian: Šv. Kazimiero bažnyčia, Latin: Ecclesia Sancti Casimiri) is a Baroque Revival style church in Žemaitkiemis, Lithuania. The church was originally founded in 1586 by Garcia Alabiano, Rector of Jesuit Academy of Vilnius, while its latest version was built in 1899–1902. Its initial wooden version, completed in 1586, was the first church dedicated to Saint Casimir.

== History ==
Around 1582, the Žemaitkiemis Manor was gifted to the Jesuit Academy of Vilnius. In 1586, Garcia Alabiano, Rector of Jesuit Academy of Vilnius, founded the Church of St. Casimir in Žemaitkiemis and a wooden church was built there in 1586. Since its foundation the church was dedicated to Saint Casimir, the patron saint of Lithuania. Subsequently, the second wooden church was built in 1716. A parish school near the church is mentioned from 1777.

During a fire in the town in 1892, the old wooden church burned down. When a rumor spread that a Russian Orthodox church was to be built on the site of the burned down old wooden church, a wooden church from the town of Želva was hastily purchased and re-erected in the place of the burned down old church. Moreover, the local people defied the Tsarist militia's order to halt the construction of the church. Consequently, the parish priest, M. Gulbinas, was exiled to Kaluga, Kaluga Governorate for three years, and three workers who had helped him to build the church were also exiled for two years.

A masonry church was designed in 1892. For a long time, the parishioners were unable to obtain official permission for its construction. The repercussions of the case surrounding the construction of this church were significant for all of Russian-occupied Lithuania. In 1896, the Russian Minister of Internal Affairs issued a decree (in effect until 1899) stating that the government authorization was not required for the rebuilding or reconstruction of churches. Through the efforts of the priest Antanas Jucevičius, the current masonry church was built between 1899–1902.

In 2007, the church complex was inscribed to the Registry of Cultural Property of Lithuania.
