= Žemaitkiemis meteorite =

Meteorite found in Lithuania

Žemaitkiemis
- Type: Chondrite
- Class: Ordinary chondrite
- Group: L chondrite
- Subgroup: L6
- Country: Lithuania
- Region: Ukmergė District Municipality
- Coordinates: 55°18′N 25°00′E
- Observed fall: Yes
- Fall date: 2 February 1933
- TKW: 44 kilograms (97 lb)
- Strewn field: Yes

Žemaitkiemis meteorite is an ordinary chondrite that fell near Žemaitkiemis, Lithuania at about 8:33 pm on 2 February 1933. Using the argon–argon dating method, scientists have calculated its age to be about 520 million years.

Meteorite on the coat of arms of Žemaitkiemis

The fall was observed by the Koenigsberg Observatory. Since the meteorite fell near inhabited areas during winter, it was rather easy to locate the fragments in the snow. In total, 20 fragments with a combined weight of 42.2 kilograms (93 lb) were collected and donated to the Vytautas Magnus University. The largest pieces weighted 7,258 and 7,080 grams (256.0 and 249.7 oz). Two other fragments were gifted later – 36.6 grams (1.29 oz) and 1,840 grams (65 oz) – to the Institute of Geology and Geography in Vilnius. There were also reports of a 10 kilograms (22 lb) fragment found about 3 kilometres (1.9 mi) from Žemaitkiemis in 1938. More pieces likely fell into the Kliepšiai Lake or were kept by the locals.

The main mass, two largest fragments and 13 other fragments, are held by the Geology Museum of Vilnius University. Other fragments are held by: 2.1 kilograms (4.6 lb) by the National Museum in Prague, 1.1 kilograms (2.4 lb) by the Russian Academy of Science, 636 grams (22.4 oz) by the Natural History Museum in London, 69 grams (2.4 oz) by the National Museum of Natural History in Paris, 33 grams (1.2 oz) by the Field Museum of Natural History in Chicago, 13.9 grams (0.49 oz) by the Geological Survey of Canada, and others.

On 14 July 2017, President Dalia Grybauskaitė approved a coat of arms of Žemaitkiemis that features the meteorite fall.
