= Saint Casimir =

Lithuanian and Polish saint (1458–1484)

- Three-Handed Saint Casimir (16th century) is considered to be miraculous. He is depicted wearing Gediminas' Cap.

Confessor of the Faith
- Born: 3 October 1458; Wawel, Kraków, Kingdom of Poland
- Died: 4 March 1484 (aged 25); Grodno, Grand Duchy of Lithuania
- Venerated in: Catholic Church
- Canonized: 1521 or 1602, Rome, Papal States, by Pope Leo X or Pope Clement VIII
- Major shrine: Chapel of Saint Casimir, Vilnius Cathedral; Church of St. Casimir, Vilnius
- Feast: 4 March
- Attributes: Lily, grand ducal cap
- Patronage: Lithuania (1636), Lithuanian youth (1948)

Casimir Jagiellon (/ˈkæzɪmɪər/; Latin: Casimirus; Lithuanian: Kazimieras; Polish: Kazimierz; 3 October 1458 – 4 March 1484) was a prince of the Kingdom of Poland and of the Grand Duchy of Lithuania. The second son of King Casimir IV Jagiellon, he was tutored by Johannes Longinus, a Polish chronicler, diplomat, and priest. After his elder brother Vladislaus was elected as King of Bohemia in 1471, Casimir became the heir presumptive. At the age of 13, Casimir participated in the failed military campaign to install him as King of Hungary. He became known for his piety, devotion to God, and generosity towards the sick and poor. He became ill (most likely with tuberculosis) and died at the age of 25. He was buried in Vilnius Cathedral. His canonization was initiated by his brother King Sigismund I the Old in 1514 and the tradition holds that he was canonized in 1521. Saint Casimir the Prince is the patron saint of Poland, Lithuania and Lithuanian youth and the only saint with this name.

Veneration of Casimir saw a resurgence in the 17th century when his feast day was confirmed by the pope in 1602 and the dedicated Chapel of Saint Casimir was completed in 1636. Casimir became a patron saint of Lithuania and Lithuanian youth. In Vilnius, his feast day is marked annually with Kaziuko mugė (a trade fair) held on the Sunday nearest to 4 March, the anniversary of his death. There are more than 50 churches named after Casimir in Lithuania and Poland, including Church of St. Casimir, Vilnius and St. Kazimierz Church, Warsaw, and more than 50 churches in Lithuanian and Polish diaspora communities in America. Women's congregation Sisters of Saint Casimir was established in 1908 and remains active in the United States.

== Biography ==
=== Early life and education ===
A member of the Jagiellon dynasty, Casimir was born in Wawel Castle in Kraków. Casimir was the third child and the second son of the king of Poland and grand duke of Lithuania, Casimir IV, and Elisabeth of Austria. Queen Elisabeth was a loving mother and took active interest in her children's upbringing. They often accompanied King Casimir in his annual trips to Lithuania.

Casimir was a polyglot and knew Lithuanian, Polish, German and Latin languages. From the age of nine, Casimir and his brother Vladislaus were educated by the Polish priest Fr. Jan Długosz. The boys were taught Latin and German, law, history, rhetoric, and classical literature. Długosz was a strict and conservative teacher who emphasized ethics, morality, and religious devotion. According to Stanisław Orzechowski (1513–1566), the princes were subject to corporal punishment which was approved by their father. Długosz noted Casimir's skills in oratory when he delivered speeches to greet his father returning to Poland in 1469 and Jakub Sienienski, the bishop of Kujawy, in 1470.

=== Hungarian campaign ===
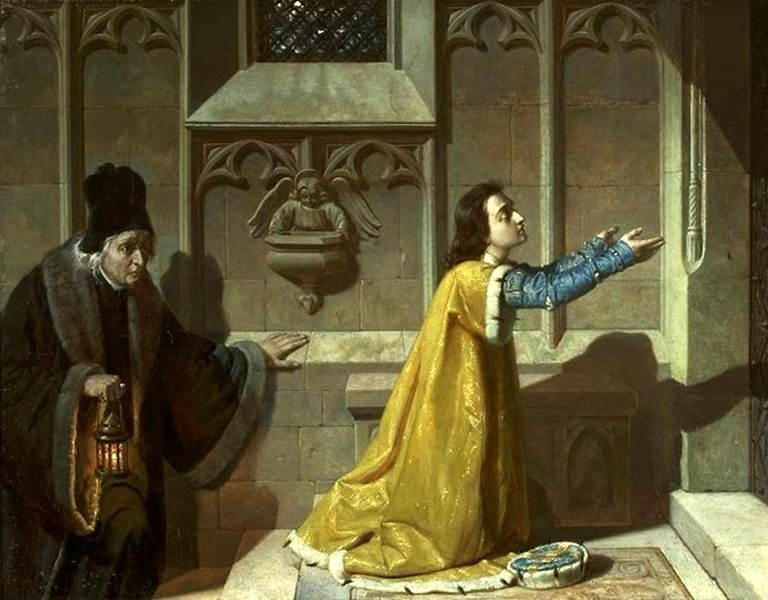
Długosz and Saint Casimir by Florian Cynk (circa 1869)

Prince Casimir's uncle Ladislaus the Posthumous, King of Hungary and Bohemia, died in 1457 at the age of 17, without leaving an heir. Casimir's father, King Casimir IV, subsequently advanced his claims to Hungary and Bohemia, but could not enforce them due to the Thirteen Years' War (1454–66). Instead, Hungarian nobles elected Matthias Corvinus and Bohemian nobles selected George of Poděbrady as their kings. George of Poděbrady died in March 1471. In May 1471, Vladislaus, eldest son of Casimir IV, was elected to the throne of Bohemia. However, a group of Catholic Bohemian nobles supported Matthias Corvinus instead of Vladislaus II. In turn, a group of Hungarian nobles conspired against Matthias Corvinus and invited the Polish king to overthrow him. King Casimir IV decided to install his son, Casimir, in Hungary.

Poland amassed an army of 12,000 men, commanded by Piotr Dunin and Dziersław of Rytwiany. Both King Casimir and Prince Casimir participated in the campaign. In October 1471, the Polish army crossed the Hungarian border and slowly marched towards Buda. Matthias Corvinus managed to win over the majority of the Hungarian nobles, including the main conspirator Archbishop János Vitéz, and the Polish army did not receive the expected reinforcements. Only Deák, Perény and Rozgonyi families sent troops. Upon hearing that Corvinus' army of 16,000 men camped outside of Pest, the Polish army decided to retreat from Hatvan to Nitra. There the soldiers battled food shortages, spreading infectious diseases, and the upcoming winter. The Polish King also lacked funds to pay the mercenaries. As a result, the Polish army decreased by about a third. In December 1471, Prince Casimir, out of fear for his safety, was sent to Jihlava closer to the Polish border and that further eroded their soldiers' morale. Corvinus took Nitra and a one-year truce was completed in March 1472 in Buda. Prince Casimir returned to Kraków to resume his studies with Długosz.

Długosz remarked that Prince Casimir felt "great sorrow and shame" regarding the failure in Hungary. Polish propaganda, however, portrayed him as a savior, sent by divine providence, to protect the people from a godless tyrant (i.e. Matthias Corvinus) and marauding pagans (i.e. Muslim Ottoman Turks). Prince Casimir was also exposed to the cult of his uncle King Władysław III of Poland who died in the 1444 Battle of Varna against the Ottomans. This led some researchers, including Jacob Caro, to conclude that the Hungarian campaign pushed Prince Casimir into religious life.

=== Later life and death ===
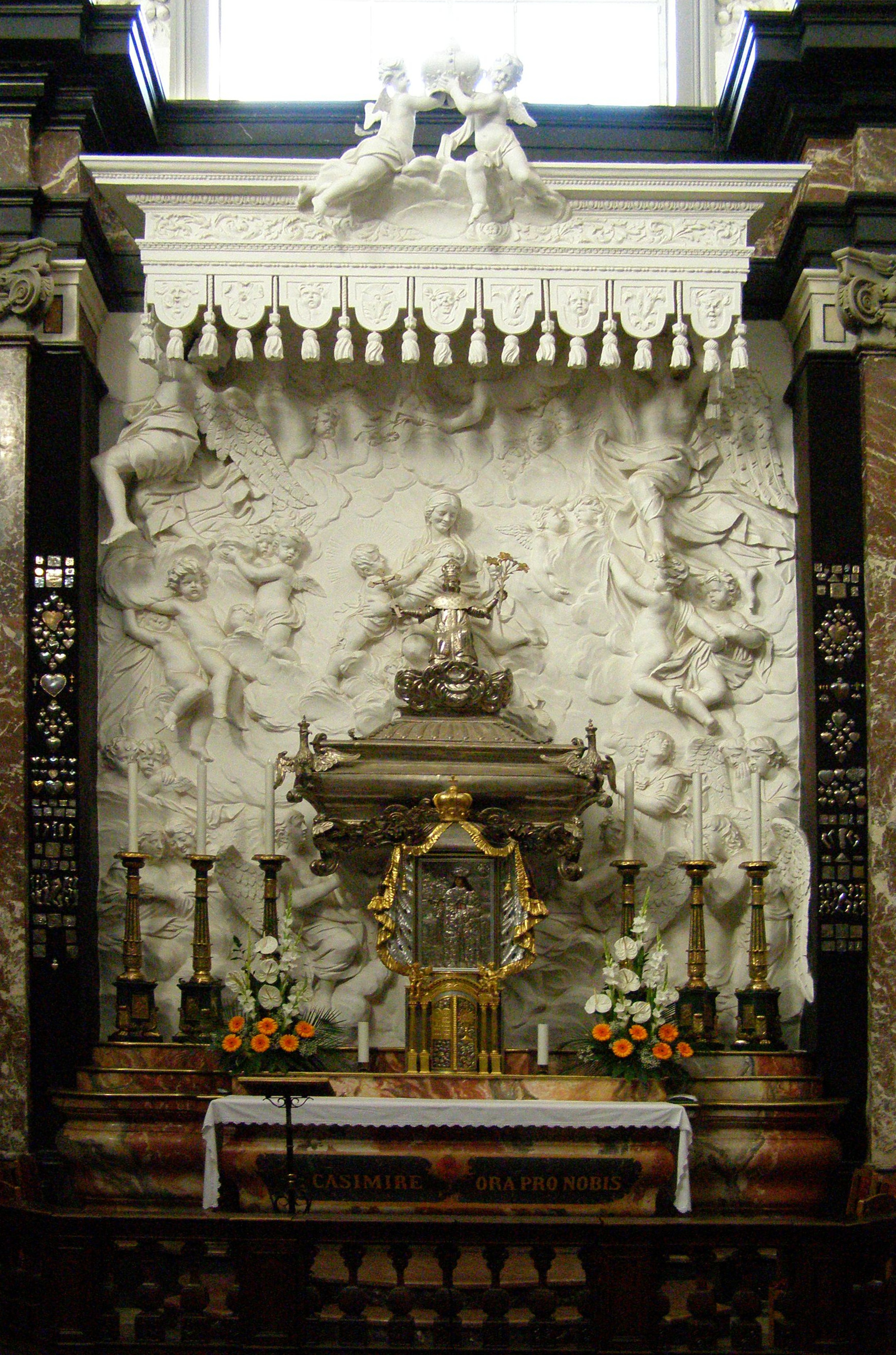
Casimir's silver sarcophagus at the Chapel of Saint Casimir, Vilnius Cathedral

As his elder brother, Vladislaus II, ruled Bohemia, Prince Casimir became the heir presumptive to the throne of Poland and Lithuania. Italian humanist writer Filippo Buonaccorsi (also known as Filip Callimachus) was hired to become Casimir's tutor in political matters, but his Renaissance views had less influence on Casimir than Długosz. In 1474, the Italian merchant and traveler Ambrogio Contarini met with Prince Casimir and was impressed by his wisdom. Prince Casimir completed his formal education at age 16 and spent most of his time with his father. In 1476, Prince Casimir accompanied his father to Royal Prussia where he tried to resolve the conflict with the Prince-Bishopric of Warmia. In 1478 Seimas of the Grand Duchy of Lithuania demanded that King Casimir IV leave either Prince Casimir or Prince John I Albert in Lithuania as a regent. King Casimir IV feared separatist moods and refused, but after settling the conflict in Prussia, moved to Vilnius.

Between 1479 and 1484 his father spent most of his time in Vilnius attending to the affairs of Lithuania. In 1481, Mikhailo Olelkovich and his relatives planned to murder King Casimir and Prince Casimir during a hunt at a wedding of Feodor Ivanovich Belsky. The plan was discovered and Prince Casimir, perhaps fearing for his safety, was sent to Poland to act as vice-regent. Around the same time his father tried to arrange his marriage to Kunigunde of Austria, daughter of Emperor Frederick III. It is often said that Prince Casimir refused the match, preferring to remain celibate and sensing his approaching death. According to Maciej Miechowita, Prince Casimir developed tuberculosis. In May 1483, Prince Casimir joined his father in Vilnius. There, after the death of Andrzej Oporowski, Bishop and Vice-Chancellor of the Crown, Prince Casimir took over some of his duties in the chancellery. However, his health deteriorated while rumors about his piety and good deeds spread further. In February 1484, the Polish sejm in Lublin was aborted as King Casimir IV rushed back to Lithuania to be with his ill son. Prince Casimir died on 4 March 1484, in Grodno. His remains were interred in Vilnius Cathedral, where the dedicated Saint Casimir's Chapel was built in 1636.

== Veneration ==
=== Pious life and attributed miracles ===
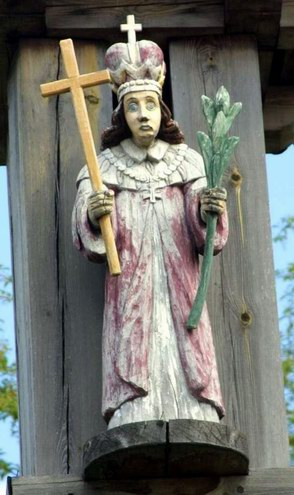
Lithuanian folk sculpture of Saint Casimir

Surviving contemporary accounts described Prince Casimir as a young man of exceptional intellect and education, humility and politeness, who strove for justice and fairness. Early sources do not attest to his piety or devotion to God, but his inclination to religious life increased towards the end of his life. Later sources provide some stories of Casimir's religious life. Marcin Kromer (1512–1589) said Casimir refused his physician's advice to have sexual relations with women in hopes to cure his illness. Other accounts say Casimir contracted his lung disease after a particularly hard fast or that he could be found pre-dawn, kneeling by the church gates, waiting for a priest to open them. Zacharias Ferreri (1479–1524) wrote that Casimir composed a prayer in hexameter on Christ's incarnation but this text has not survived. Later, a copy of Omni die dic Mariae ("Daily, Daily Sing to Mary") was found in Casimir's coffin. The hymn became so strongly associated with Casimir that sometimes it is known as "Hymn of St. Casimir" and he is credited as its author. The lengthy hymn has an intricate meter and rhyme scheme (alternate acatalectic and catalectic trochaic dimeter with internal rhyme in the first and third verses (aa/b, cc/b)) and was most likely written by Bernard of Cluny.

One of the first miracles attributed to Casimir was his appearance before the Lithuanian army during the Siege of Polotsk in 1518. Casimir showed where Lithuanian troops could safely cross the Daugava River and relieve the city, besieged by the army of the Grand Duchy of Moscow. Ferreri's hagiography of 1521 mentions many miracles of Casimir are known but describes only one – a Lithuanian victory against the Russians. The description lacks specifics, such as date or location, but most likely refers to the Lithuanian victory in 1519 against Russian troops that raided the environs of Vilnius, and not the more popular story of the Siege of Polotsk.

=== Canonization and official veneration ===
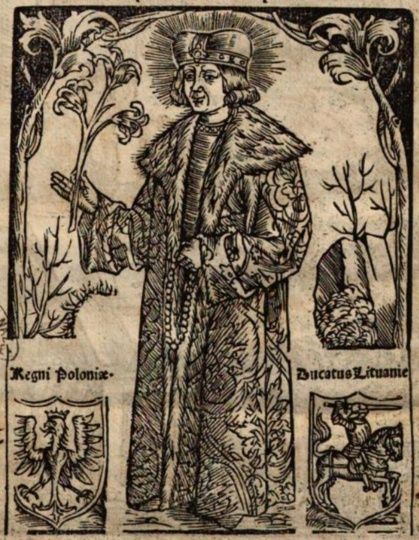
Saint Casimir on the cover page of his first hagiography

Casimir's official cult started spreading soon after his death. In 1501, Pope Alexander VI, citing Casimir's miracles as well as the splendor of the chapel where he was buried, granted a special indulgence to those who would pray in the chapel from one vespers to another during certain Catholic festivals, and would contribute to the upkeep of the chapel. In 1513, Andrzej Krzycki wrote a poem mentioning numerous wax votive offerings on Casimir's grave. In 1514, during the Fifth Council of the Lateran, Casimir's brother Sigismund I the Old petitioned the pope to canonize Casimir. After repeated requests, in November 1517, Pope Leo X appointed a three-bishop commission and later sent his legate Zacharias Ferreri to investigate. He arrived at Vilnius in September 1520 and completed his work in about two months. His findings, the first short hagiography of Casimir, was published in 1521 in Kraków as Vita Beati Casimiri Confessoris. The canonization was all but certain but Pope Leo X died in December 1521. Research of Zenonas Ivinskis and Paulius Rabikauskas showed that there is no documentary proof that he issued a papal bull canonizing Casimir but many important documents were lost during the Sack of Rome (1527). The Protestant Reformation attacked the cult of saints and there were no new canonizations between 1523 and 1588. However, Casimir was included in the first Roman Martyrology, published in 1583.

The cause of Casimir's cult was taken up by the new Bishop of Vilnius Benedykt Woyna (appointed in 1600). He sent canon Gregorius Swiecicki to Rome with a letter from King Sigismund III Vasa requesting to add the feast of Casimir to the Roman Breviary and Roman Missal. The Sacred Congregation of Rites refused the request but on 7 November 1602 Pope Clement VIII issued a papal brief Quae ad sanctorum which authorized his feast sub duplici ritu on 4 March but only in Poland and Lithuania. The brief also mentioned that Casimir was added to the ranks of saints by Pope Leo X. In the absence of any earlier known papal document explicitly mentioning Casimir as saint, the brief is often cited as Casimir's canonization. Swiecicki returned to Vilnius with the papal brief and red velvet labarum with the image of Saint Casimir. The city organized a large three-day festival on 10–12 May 1604 to properly accept the papal flag. On the third day, the cornerstone was laid for the new Church of St. Casimir. The coffin of Casimir was taken out of the crypt and elevated to the altar. Swiecicki testified that when the coffin was opened in August 1604 a wonderful smell filled the cathedral for three days.

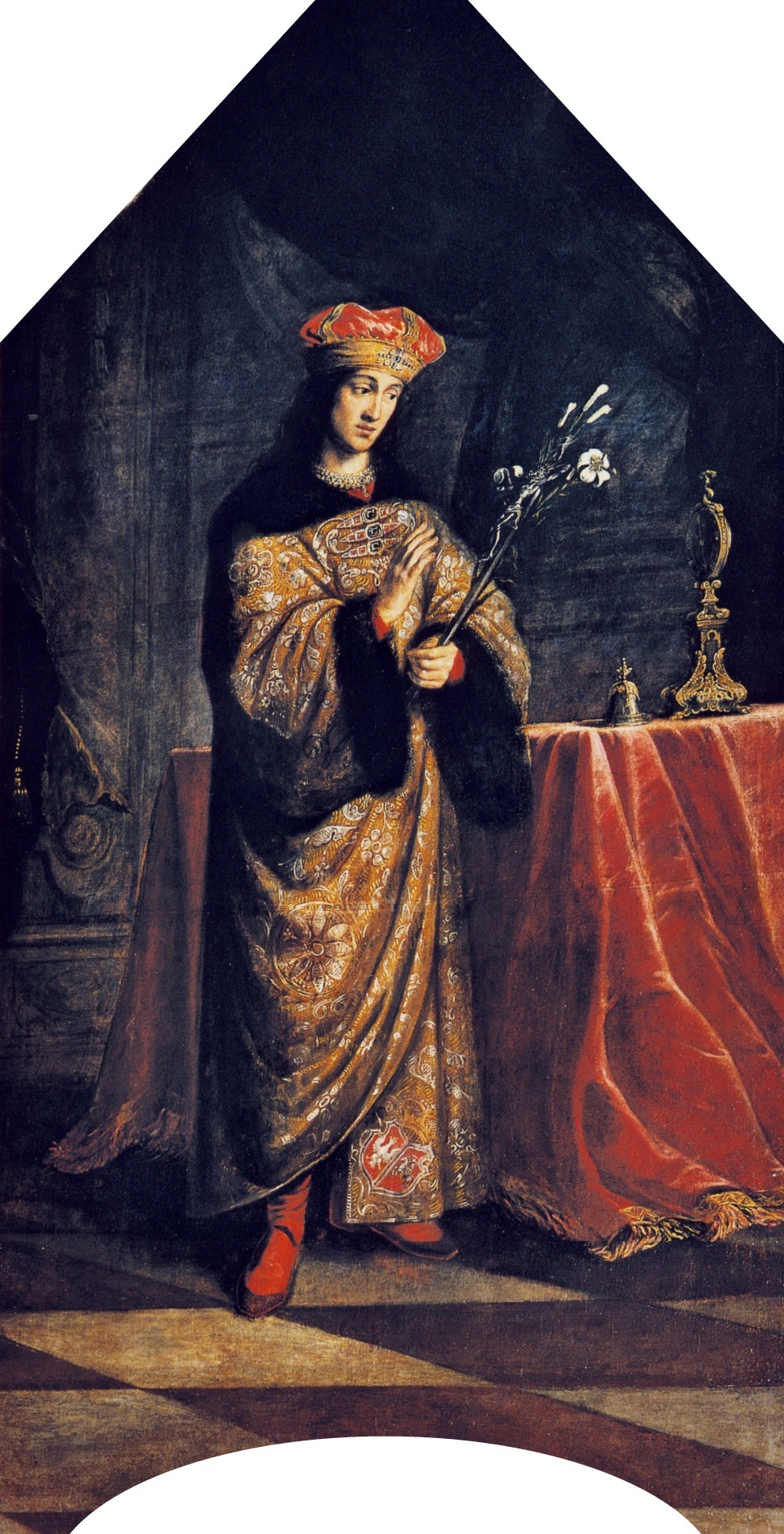
Saint Casimir by Daniel Schultz (1615–1683)

In 1607 and 1613, Bishop Woyna declared Casimir patron saint of Lithuania (Patronus principalis Lithuaniae). The issue of a universal Casimir's feast was not forgotten and in 1620 Bishop Eustachy Wołłowicz petitioned Pope Paul V to add Casimir to the Roman Breviary and Roman Missal. This time the Sacred Congregation of Rites granted the request in March 1621 and added his feast sub ritu semiduplici. In March 1636, Pope Urban VIII allowed the celebration of the feast of Casimir with an octave (duplex cum octava) in the Diocese of Vilnius and the Grand Duchy of Lithuania. That is equivalent of proclaiming Casimir as the patron saint of Lithuania. On 28 September 1652, Pope Innocent X allowed a fest of transfer of relics of Casimir on a Sunday following the Assumption of Mary. On 11 June 1948, when many Lithuanians were displaced war refugees, Pope Pius XII named Casimir the special patron of Lithuanian youth.

=== Iconography ===
Saint Casimir's painting in Vilnius Cathedral is considered to be miraculous. The painting, probably completed around 1520, depicts the saint with two right hands. According to a legend, the painter attempted to redraw the hand in a different place and paint over the old hand, but the old hand miraculously reappeared. More conventional explanations claim that three-handed Casimir was the original intent of the painter to emphasize the exceptional generosity of Casimir ("But when you give to someone in need, don't let your left hand know what your right hand is doing." Matthew 6:3) or that the old hand bled through a coat of new paint (similar to a palimpsest). Around 1636 the painting was covered in gilded silver clothing (riza).

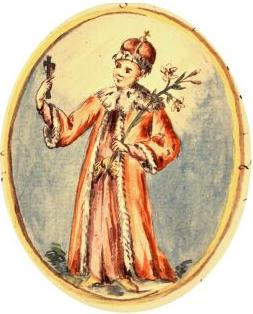
Nemunaitis coat of arms (1792)

Casimir's iconography usually follows the three-handed painting. He is usually depicted as a young man in long red robe lined with stoat fur. Sometimes he wears a red cap of the Grand Duke of Lithuania, but other times, to emphasize his devotion to spiritual life, the cap is placed near Casimir. Almost always he holds a lily, a symbol of virginity, innocence, and purity. He might also hold a cross, a rosary, or a book with words from Omni die dic Mariae (Daily, Daily Sing to Mary). The towns of Kvėdarna and Nemunaitis in Lithuania have Saint Casimir depicted on their coat of arms.

=== Physical remains and relics ===
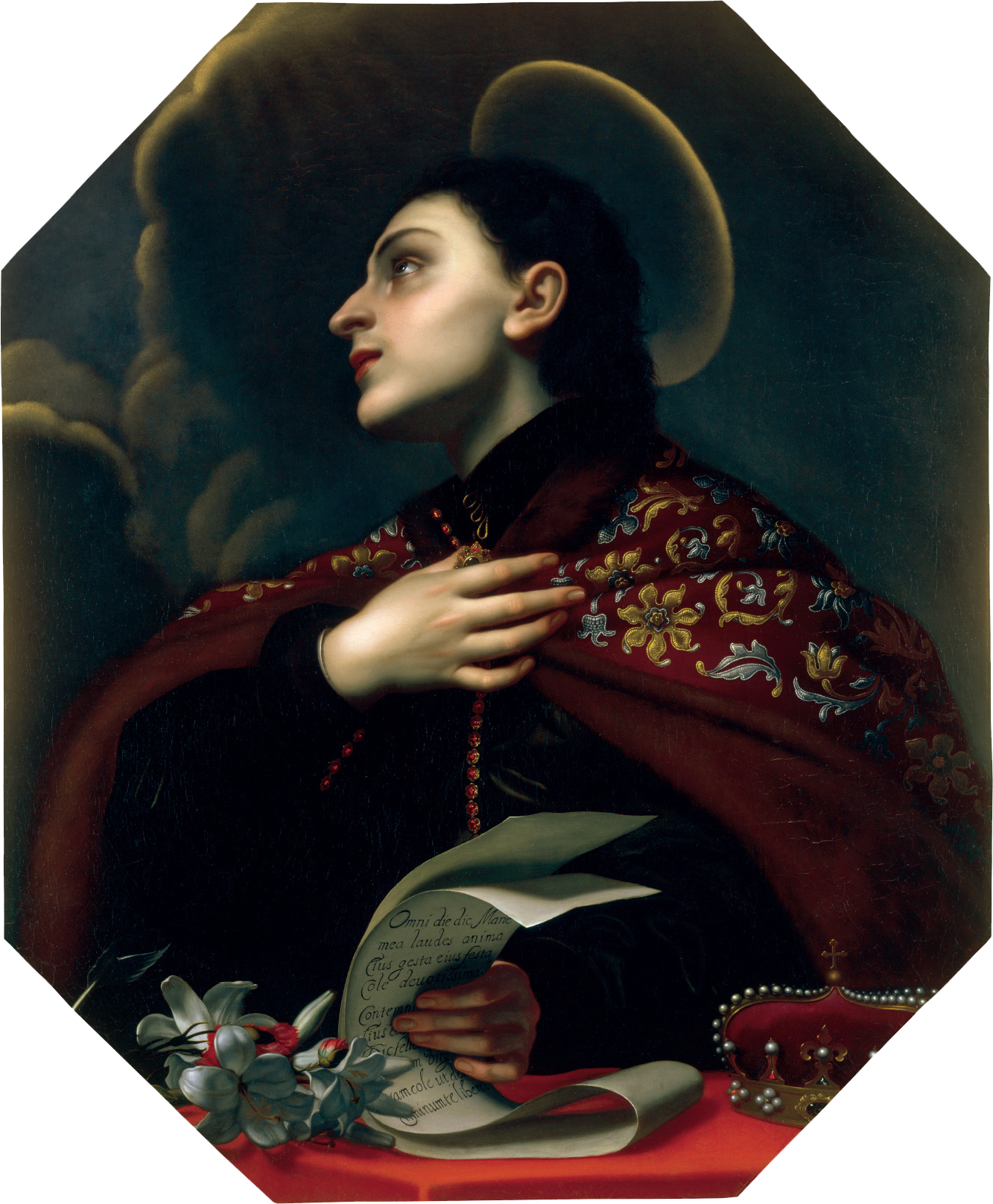
Saint Casimir by Carlo Dolci (1616–1686) in the collection of Palazzo Pitti

Casimir was buried in the crypt under the Royal Chapel of Vilnius Cathedral (present-day Wołłowicz Chapel to the left from the main entrance), constructed by his father in the Gothic style in 1474. In 1604, the coffin was elevated from the crypt to the altar and in 1636 moved to the dedicated Chapel of Saint Casimir. The present-day sarcophagus was made in 1747 under the last will of Bishop of Warmia Christopher Johan Szembek (1680–1740). It is made of linden wood and covered with silver plates; its corners are decorated with gilded eagles. The sarcophagus was removed from the cathedral on three occasions. In 1655, before the Battle of Vilnius during the Deluge, the relics were removed most likely by Jerzy Białłozor and hid by Cyprian Paweł Brzostowski and later by the Sapiehas in the Ruzhany Palace. They were returned to the devastated chapel in 1663. The relics were removed for a short time in 1702 during the Battle of Vilnius of the Great Northern War. In October 1952, the relics were quietly moved to the Church of St. Peter and St. Paul by the order of Soviet authorities. The cathedral was turned into an art gallery. The relics returned to their place in 1989 when the cathedral was reconsecrated.

After the rediscovery of the Catacombs of Rome in 1578, the cult of relics spread throughout Europe and the trend did not skip Casimir. The coffin of Casimir was opened in early 1602 and in August 1604. At the time, canon Gregorius Swiecicki testified that despite humidity the body was intact. But in 1667 there were only bones left; they were inventoried and placed into six cloth bags. Surviving written records indicate that the coffin was opened in 1664, 1667, 1677, 1690, 1736, 1838, 1878 (twice), and 1922. There are several recorded instances when Casimir's relics were gifted to prominent figures and societies: to musicians' confraternity at San Giorgio Maggiore, Naples in early 1650s, to King John III Sobieski and Cosimo III de' Medici, Grand Duke of Tuscany (Note: The full tibia is now held at the Basilica of San Lorenzo, Florence in a reliquary by Massimiliano Soldani Benzi. Image can be seen at The Treasure of the ‘Chapel of Relics’ in the Pitti Palace – Sacri Splendori. In return, Vilnius Cathedral received relics of Mary Magdalene de' Pazzi. (Česnulis (2014), p. 14)) in October 1677, to the Sodality of Our Lady of the Jesuit academy in Mechelen and the Order of Malta in October 1690, to Queen Maria Josepha of Austria in February 1736, to Cistercian abbot Sztárek Lajos of Cikádor Abbey in 1860. Many more relics of Casimir can be found in local churches. In particular, in 1838, two teeth and ten unspecified bones were removed from the coffin; the bones were cut into small pieces and distributed among various churches. In 1922, the bones were wrapped in a new cloth and the old cloth was distributed as a relic. It was the last time that a relic of Casimir (one tooth for the Church of St. Casimir) was taken.

=== Dedications ===
In his 1970 monograph priest Florijonas Neviera (Florian Niewiero, 1896–1976) counted churches named after Casimir. He found 12 churches in Lithuania (as of 1940), 48 churches and 5 chapels in Poland, 23 Lithuanian and 36 Polish churches in the United States (as of 1964), five churches in Canada (Montreal, Winnipeg, Toronto, Portneuf, and Ripon), two churches in United Kingdom (London and Manchester), and two churches in Belarus (Vselyub and Lepiel). In 1586, Garcia Alabiano, Rector of Jesuit Academy of Vilnius, founded the Church of St. Casimir in Žemaitkiemis, which was completed in 1586 and was the first church dedicated to Saint Casimir, however this wooden church was not preserved and it was later rebuilt as other wooden and masonry churches. The oldest surviving masonry church dedicated to Saint Casimir is the Church of St. Casimir in Vilnius, completed in 1618 and consecrated in 1635. The women's congregation Sisters of Saint Casimir was established in 1908 by Maria Kaupas and is active in the United States. In 1945, the College of Saint Casimir was established in Rome to educate Lithuanian priests who fled west after World War II.

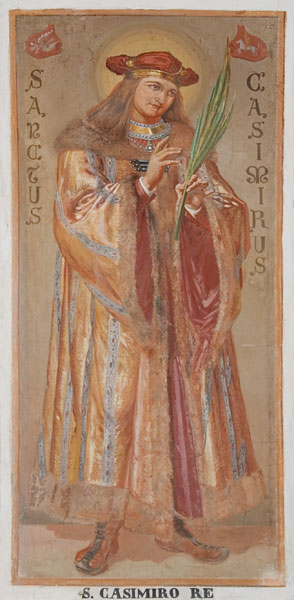
Fresco of Saint Casimir in the Santuario della Mentorella, painted in the 19th century

While the devotion to Casimir is most prevalent in Lithuania and Poland and their diaspora communities, his cult can be found in other countries as well. In the 17th century, at least two societies of Saint Casimir were active in Mechelen and Antwerp (now Belgium). In the 17th century, Casimir's cult also spread in Italy, particularly Florence, Palermo, Naples; his cult in Rome was more associated with Polish dignitaries and émigrés. Musical performances were organized in Rome in 1675 (words by Sebastiano Lazzarini, music by Francesco Beretta, performed at Santo Spirito in Sassia) and in 1678 (words by Ottavio Santacroce, music probably by Giovanni Bicilli, performed at Santa Maria in Vallicella on the occasion of the visit by Michał Kazimierz Radziwiłł and his wife Katarzyna Sobieska), and in Florence in 1706 (words possibly by Cardinal Pietro Ottoboni, music by Alessandro Scarlatti). In Palermo, Pietro Novelli was commissioned painting Coronation of Saint Casimir (l'Incoronazione di s. Casimiro) for the altar of Chiesa di San Nicola da Tolentino (now held at the Galleria Regionale della Sicilia).

The settlements of Saint-Casimir in Canada (founded 1836) and San Casimiro in Venezuela (founded 1785) are named after him. Sculptures of Casimir, among other canonized royals, can be found in San Ferdinando, Livorno, Italy and Metropolitan Cathedral, Mexico City. Stained glass windows with Casimir can be found at the Cathedral Basilica of St. Joseph in San Jose, California, and at the Church of St. Peter in Chevaigné, France. Since 1846, there is a nursing home in Paris named Maison Saint-Casimir. It was created by the Polish community of France and is run since its opening by Polish nuns Daughters of Charity of Saint Vincent de Paul.

== Bibliography ==
- Abos, Girolamo (2003). Vella Bondin, Joseph (ed.). Stabat Mater. Recent Researches in the Music of the Classical Era. A-R Editions, Inc. ISBN 9780895795311.
- Ahlgren, Gillian T. W. (1998). Teresa of Avila and the Politics of Sanctity. Cornell University Press. ISBN 9780801485725.
- Baronas, Darius (7 April 2013). "LDK istorija: Algirdo antroji žmona Julijona – savo valandos sulaukusi našlė" (in Lithuanian). Savaitraštis „15min“. ISSN 1822-5330.
- Békefi, Remig (1894). A Czikádori apátság története (in Hungarian). Pécs.
- Burns, Paul (2007). Butler's Saint for the Day (revised ed.). Liturgical Press. ISBN 9780814618363.
- Česnulis, Vytautas (27 September 2014). "Kun. F. Nevieros kūrybinio palikimo papildymas" (PDF). Voruta (in Lithuanian). 13 (803). ISSN 1392-0677. Archived (PDF) from the original on 9 October 2022.
- Čiurinskas, Mintautas (2003). Šv. Kazimiero gyvenimo ir kulto šaltiniai (PDF) (in Lithuanian). Vilnius: Aidai. ISBN 9955-445-72-6.
- Čiurinskas, Mintautas (2004). Ankstyvieji šv Kazimiero "gyvenimai" (PDF) (in Lithuanian). Vilnius: Aidai. ISBN 9789955656012.
- Conway, G. E. (2003). "Omni die dic Mariae". New Catholic Encyclopedia. Vol. 10 (2nd ed.). Thomson/Gale. p. 591. ISBN 9780787640040.
- Ivinskis, Zenonas (1953–1966). "Jaunė". Lietuvių enciklopedija (in Lithuanian). Vol. IX. Boston, Massachusetts: Lietuvių enciklopedijos leidykla. p. 335. LCCN 55020366.
- Liulevičius, Vincentas (February 1984). "Šventasis Kazimieras (II)". Laiškai lietuviams (in Lithuanian). 2 (XXXV): 39–41. ISSN 0455-177X.
- Duczmal, Małgorzata (2012). Jogailaičiai (in Lithuanian). translated by Birutė Mikalonienė and Vyturys Jarutis. Vilnius: Mokslo ir enciklopedijų leidybos centras. ISBN 978-5-420-01703-6.
- Mancuso, Barbara (2013). "Novelli, Pietro". Dizionario Biografico degli Italiani (in Italian). Vol. 78. Istituto della Enciclopedia italiana. ISBN 9788812000326.
- Maslauskaitė, Sigita (2006). "Šv. Kazimiero relikvijos ir relikvijoriai". In Račiūnaitė, Tojana (ed.). Šventųjų relikvijos Lietuvos kultūroje. Acta Academiae Artium Vilnensis (in Lithuanian). Vol. 41. Vilniaus dailės akademijos leidykla. ISBN 9955624612.
- Paltarokas, Kazimieras (2010). Karalaitis Šventasis Kazimieras (PDF) (in Lithuanian). Danielius. ISBN 978-9955-476-84-9. Archived (PDF) from the original on 9 October 2022.
- Rabikauskas, Paulius (March 1958a). "Didžiosios šv. Kazimiero šventės Vilniuje 1604–1606 metais". Aidai (in Lithuanian). 3 (108): 118–128. ISSN 0002-208X.
- Rabikauskas, Paulius (September 1958b). "Pastabos prie šv. Kazimiero garbinimo istorijos". Aidai (in Lithuanian). 7 (112): 305–311. ISSN 0002-208X.
- Rabikauskas, Paulius (March 1960). "Šv. Kazimiero garbinimas Flandrijoje". Laiškai lietuviams (in Lithuanian). 3 (10): 69–72. ISSN 0455-177X.
- Rėklaitis, Povilas (April 1958). "Šv. Kazimiero koplyčia Vilniuje (II)". Aidai (in Lithuanian). 4 (109). ISSN 0002-208X.
- Ryszka-Komarnicka, Anna (2009). "The Musical Characteristics of Wordly Temptations in Alessandro Scarlatti's S. Casimiro, re di Polonia: Regio Fasto (Royal Splendour) as the Main Protagonist, and the Possible Origins of the Oratorio" (PDF). Musicology Today. 6: 113–126. ISSN 1734-1663. Archived (PDF) from the original on 9 October 2022.
- Šapoka, Adolfas (March 1958). "Šv. Kazimiero palaikų saugojimas". Aidai (in Lithuanian). 3 (108): 140–144. ISSN 0002-208X.
- Vaišnora, Juozas (1958). Marijos garbinimas Lietuvoje (PDF) (in Lithuanian). Rome: Lietuvių katalikų mokslo akademija. OCLC 1065089. Archived (PDF) from the original on 9 October 2022.
- Vilimas, Jonas (2012). Grigališkojo choralo tradicijos bruožai Lietuvos didžiojoje kunigaikštystėje. XV-XVIII amžių atodangos ir rekonstrukcijos bandymas (PhD thesis) (in Lithuanian). Vilnius University.
- Vilnius Cathedral. "Šv. Kazimiero sarkofagas ir relikvijos" (in Lithuanian).
- Žemaitytė, Dalia (3 March 2012). "Šv. Kazimiero kultas: ištakos ir dabartis" (in Lithuanian). Bernardinai.lt.
