= Lubicz coat of arms =

Polish coat of arms

Lubicz
- Battle cry: Luba, Lubicz
- Alternative names: Libicz, Luba, Lubow, Łuba, Łubik
- Earliest mention: 1348 (seal)
- Cities: Łapy
- Divisions: Gmina Łapy, Gmina Żółkiewka
- Families: Surnames recorded with these arms Abrahamowicz, Abramowicz, Adamowicz, Algiminowicz, Algminowicz, Anczewski, Andrzejkowicz, Arcemberski, Arynek, Arynka. Babecki, Baczewski, Bagieński, Baginowicz, Bagiński, Bajkowski, Bajużewicz, Bakaliński, Bakanowski, Balcewicz, Barcicki, Barcikowski, Barczykowski, Bardzikowski, Bartka, Bartkowski, Bartosiewicz, Baykowski, Bażewicz, Bednarski, Bedoński, Beduński, Bejdo, Bekanowski, Berdowski, Bernacki, Białobłocki, Białochowski, Białoskórski, Białowieski, Białynowicz, Białyński, Biecz, Bieganowski, Bielewski, Bieluński, Biełowiejski, Biernacki, Biernacik, Biesiekierski, Bledzewski, Bledziewicz, Bledziewski, Bloduch, Bloducho, Błędzewski, Błoński, Bobakowski, Bobrowski, Bochanowicz, Bocianowski, Bogdanowicz, Bogusław, Bohanowicz, Bohdanowicz, Bohusław, Bolanowski, Bolecki, Bolęcki, Borchowski, Borkowski, Borowski, Bortkiewicz, Boruta, Borzechowski, Borzestowski, Borzewski, Borzymowski, Bożewicz, Bożopolski, Bożyczko, Brajczewski, Brettonier, Brochowski, Brudnicki, Brykczyński, Brzezieński, Brzezina, Brzeziński, Brzoski, Brzowski, Brzozowski, Brzóski, Brzumieński, Brzumiński, Buczyński, Buderadzki, Buderaski, Budny, Budrewicz, Budzisław, Budziszewski, Bukanowski, Bułanowicz, Burbekl, Burczyński, Burnejko, Burnicki, Burniewicz, Burzeński, Burzymowski. Cichocki, Chaborski, Chabowski, Chechlewski, Chechłowski, Chełchowski, Chełmowski, Chełtowski, Chibowski, Chilkiewicz, Chirski, Chlebowicz, Chłapowski, Chmielecki, Chochłowski, Chodynicki, Chojecki, Chojnowicz, Chojnowski, Chołchowski, Chomontowski, Choromański, Chorostecki, Choscki, Chotolski, Choynowski, Chrabłowski, Chrabołowski, Chramiec, Chromiański, Chromiński, Chrostowski, Chruszcz, Chrzczonowski, Chrzozonowski, Chybowski, Chybski, Chylkowski, Ciborski, Cichocki, Cichowski, Ciecierski, Cieciorski, Cielemecki, Cielemęcki, Cierpiński, Cierzpięta, Cierżpięta, Ciesielski, Cieślicki, Cieśliński, Ciężadłowski, Czaplicki, Czapski, Czartoryski, Czasławski, Czechowicz, Czerepiński, Czerniewicz, Czerwiński, Czerwonka, Częstuniewski, Czuprynowski, Czyrwiński, Czyżewski. Daniłowski, Dariusz, Darkszewicz, Daukszewicz, Dawidowicz, Dąbek, Dąbkowski, Dąbrowski, Derbut, Dernałowicz, Djakowski, Długokęcki, Dłuski, Dobkiewicz, Dobożyński, Dobrzański, Dobrzewiński, Dobrzyjałowski, Dobużyński, Doch, Dolner, Dołunek, Domalewski, Domaniecki, Domaniewski, Domanowski, Doria, Dowejko, Doweyko, Dowiat, Dowiatt, Dowtart, Dowtort, Drawdzik, Droniewicz, Drowdwiłło, Dryzdela, Drzewicki, Drzewiecki, Dubrowski, Durwoniszko, Durwonizski, Dyrwoniski, Dzierzeński, Dzierża, Dzierżeński, Dzierżyc, Dzieżyc, Dzięgielewski. Elzbut, Eszenbach, Eniecki, Entoss Fedko, Fedkowicz, Filicki, Formulewicz. Garbolewski, Gamulski, Gasacki, Gałęski, Ganiewski, Garbolewski, Gaudesz, Gawdesz, Gdowski, Gerkow, Gerkowski, Gibiński, Giecewicz, Gieczewicz, Gierałtowski, Gierczewski, Gierczyński, Gierkowski, Gierwatowski, Giewartowski, Glaczyński, Gliński, Głaczyński, Gławzdanowicz, Głębocki, Głowczewski, Główczewski, Głuszecki, Godlewski, Godwojsz, Gogol, Gojsiewski, Gojziewski, Gojżewski, Golmin, Golszański, Golwetowicz, Golwielewicz, Gołkowski, Gołwietowicz, Gomuła, Goniprowski, Gorczycki, Goreczkowski, Gorodecki, Gorzeskot, Gorzeskut, Gorzyszkot, Gostkowski, Gostyński, Goszczycki, Gościcki, Goślicki, Goślinowski, Gośliński, Gotowacz, Góreczkowski, Górski, Grabianowski, Grabowski, Grachowski, Gradowski, Graziewicz, Grażewicz, Grąbczewski, Grechorowicz, Greffen, Gregorowicz, Grochowski, Grodecki, Grodzicki, Grodziecki, Gromnicki, Gruszczewski, Gruszecki, Gruszedzki, Gruszewski, Gruszkowski, Gruziewski, Grużecki, Grużewski, Grygorowicz, Gryniewicz, Gryszedski, Gulecki, Gumkowski, Gurski, Guszkowski, Gutkowski, Guzewski, Guzowski, Gużewski. Haborski, Harynek, Hegliński, Herdman, Herman, Hlebowicz, Hławzdanowicz, Hohoł, Holszański, Hołowacz, Hołowka, Hołówka, Hołówko, Horodecki, Horodyski, Horomański, Horomatski, Horybat, Hostyński, Hovenburg, Hrehorowicz, Hryhorowicz, Hryncewicz, Hryniewicz, Huryn, Hurynowicz, Hutkowski, Hybowski. Idźkowski, Ilcewicz, Ipacewicz, Ipatowicz, Idzikiewicz. Jacewicz, Jackowski, Jagniątkowski, Jagowd, Jagowdowicz, Jakowicki, Jakubowski, Jałoza, Janczewski, Janda[potrzebne źródło], Janikowski, Janiszkiewicz, Jankowski, Januszewicz, Januszkiewicz, Januszkowicz, Jarnuszkiewicz, Jarochowski, Jaruszewicz, Jassowicz, Jastrzębski, Jaszowski, Jawornicki, Jaworowski, Jazdowski, Jegliński, Jelski, Jewnicki, Jędrzejowicz, Jucewicz, Jundził, Jundziłł, Jurcewicz, Jurewicz, Jurjewicz, Jurkiewicz, Juszczyński. Kabrytt, Kalenkowski, Kalinkowski, Kalinowski, Kaliski, Karwasiecki, Karwosiecki, Kasperowicz, Kawiecki, Kącki, Kątski, Kęcki, Kieniowski, Kierekes, Kierekesz, Kiewnarski, Kijewski, Kijowski, Kirkiłło, Klisz, Kliszkiewicz, Kłokocki, Kłopot, Kłosieński, Kłosiński, Kłusiński, Kłysz, Kobliński, Kobylański, Kobyleński, Kobyliński, Kochański, Koczanowski, Koczmierowski, Koczowski, Koćmierowski, Kokoszczyński, Kokoszyński, Komaski, Konarski, Konopka, Kopacki, Kopiński, Kopyszyński, Kordaszewicz, Kormański, Korzun, Kosmiński, Kostiuszko, Kostomłocki, Kostomołocki, Kosyszyński, Koszarski, Koszybski, Kośmierski, Kośmiński, Kotkiewicz, Kozacki, Kozarski, Kozarzewski, Kozerski, Kozicki, Kozielski, Koziński, Kozirski, Kozłowiecki, Kozłowski, Kozyrski, Koźmiński, Koźmirski, Koźniński, Kożycki, Krasowski, Krassowski, Krosnowski, Krośnicki, Krupowicz, Krupowies, Kryski, Krzanowski, Krzanowski de Lubicz, Krzecz, Krzeczkowski, Krzeczowski, Krzesimowski, Krzesiński, Krzycki, Krzyczewski, Krzyczkowski, Krzyniecki, Krzyszkowski, Krzywicki, Krzywonoski, Krzywonowski, Księżopolski, Kubiński, Kucharski, Kukla, Kukliński, Kuleń, Kulicki, Kulniow, Kulnow, Kulpowicz, Kułna-Sławeński, Kumaniecki, Kunicki, Kunisz, Kuprewicz, Kurawski, Kurowicki, Kurowski, Kuwiczyński, Kuziemski, Kuźma, Kuźmiński, Kuźnicki. Latkowski, Lega, Lejko, Lekowski, Lelewski, Lelowski, Lemieszewski, Lemieszowski, Lenkowski, Leonowicz, Leparski, Lesczyński, Lesiewicz, Leuz, Lewicki, Leyko, Ligęza, Ligowski, Lilejko, Lipiński, Lipnicki, Lipski, Lisowski, Lissowski, Listopacki, Lityński, Lopieński, Luba, Lubek, Luberski, Lubianiec, Lubiański, Lubichlerski, Lubicz, Lubiczankowski, Lubieniec, Lubieślerski, Lubiński, Lubowicki, Lubowicz, Lubowidzki, Lubsiński, Ludzicki, Ludziski, Lugajło, Lutoborski, Lutowicz, Luzecki, Lużecki, Lyskowski. Łakiewicz, Łakowicz, Łapa, Łapiński, Łappa, Łazowski, Łazowy, Łaź, Łążyński, Łękowski, Łomżyński, Łopacieński, Łopaciński, Łopacki, Łopieński, Łopiński, Łosiński, Łoskowski, Łoszewski, Łoszowski, Łowczyński, Łozicki, Łoziński, Łozowicki, Łozwicki, Łuba, Łubczyk, Łubek, Łubieniec, Łubieński, Łubik, Łubiński, Łubowicz, Ługajło, Ługowski, Łukawski, Łutowicz, Łuzecki, Łużecki, Łużeński, Łużyński, Łysakowski. Mackiewicz, Mackun, Maczkuciewicz, Majkowski, Makowiecki, Malczewski, Mankiewicz, Mankowicz, Mankutewicz, Mańkiewicz, Marchewka, Markiewicz, Maszczybrodzki, Maszewski, Maszowski, Maścibrodzki, Matusiewicz, Maykowski, Mayzner, Mażejko, Mąkiewicz, Mąkowiecki, Meisner, Meissner, Mejnartowicz, Mejsner, Meynartowicz, Meysner, Mętowski, Michaelis, Michałowski, Mickaniewicz, Mickaniewski, Miecznikowski, Mieczyk, Mieczykał, Miedecki, Mierzejewski, Mierzejowski, Mierzyński, Mieszkowicz, Migiewicz, Mikutowicz, Milatycki, Milewski, Milkiewicz, Milkowicz, Miłosz, Minczewski, Misbacki, Miszczyk, Miszejko, Miszewski, Misztolt, Misztołt, Misztowt, Miżutowicz, Młodyński, Mnichowski, Mniszewski, Mogilnicki, Mokicz, Moniuszko, Monko, Monsiewicz, Montowicz, Montowt, Montwid, Montwit, Mońko, Moskiewicz, Mostwiło, Mozejko, Mozeyko, Możejko, Mroczkowski, Murzyn, Murzynowicz, Murzynowski, Myszejko, Myszeyko, Myślecki, Myślęcki, Myśliwiec. Nabiałek, Nabiałko, Naborowski, Nagrodzki, Narejko, Narejkowicz, Nawrocki, Nekraszewicz, Nencha, Nencki, Netrebski, Niebiełowicz, Nieborski, Niebowski, Niebyłowski, Nieciecki[potrzebne źródło], Niekraszewicz, Nieliński, Nieliski, Nieluba, Nieławicki, Nieławski, Nieszkoć, Nieszokoć, Nieświastowski, Nietrebski, Niewiadomski, Niewiardowski, Niewiarowski, Niewierowski, Niewodowski, Niezabitowski, Niezabytowski, Niński, Nitowski, Niwiński, Norejko, Norejkowicz, Noreyko, Norwił, Norwiłło, Norwiło, Nosarzewski, Nosarzowski, Nowacki, Nowicki, Nowowiejski, Nowowieski. Obertowski, Obniski, Obrąpalski, Obrępalski, Obrompalski, Ojrzeński, Ojrzyński, Okraszewski, Olechowicki, Olesiński, Oleszyński, Olszanka, Olszewski, Ołowka, Onichimowski, Oniechimowski, Opulski, Orłowicz, Orłowski vel Orzłowski, Orzechowski, Orzeński, Orzęski, Orzyński, Osicki, Osiecimski, Osiejowski, Osielski, Oskowski, Osmienicki, Ossowski, Ostrouch, Oszkowski, Oszmiański, Owadowski, Owczarski, Owsianko, Owsiejenko, Oyrzyński, Oziewicz, Ożewicz, Ożyński. Pacewicz, Pachowski, Pacowski, Paczkowski, Pagiński, Paleski, Pakowicki, Papłoński, Papowski, Parulicki, Parulski, Patkowski, Paulitz, Pawłowski, Pączkowski, Peliski, Pełczycki, Perczyński, Perzanowski, Piadlewski, Piączyński, Piądziewski, Piczek, Piczkowski, Piechotka, Pieczkowski, Piejewski, Piekut, Piekutowski, Pieliski, Pieńczykowski, Pieszka, Pieszko, Pieszkowski, Pietkowicz, Pietraszko, Pietraszkowicz, Piński, Piotrowicz, Pisanka, Pisanko, Piszczatowski, Plejewski, Pluszcz, Pluszczewski, Pluszczowski, Pluszkowski, Pluśniak, Pluta, Płaszczyński, Płaziński, Płazowski, Płodowski, Płoszczewski, Płudowski, Płuszczewski, Pogorzelski, Pokrzywnicki, Pokrzywski, Polański, Polencz, Ponikowski, Popieński, Popiński, Popłoński, Portowski, Posudowicz, Posułowicz, Poszliński, Potapowicz, Potocki, Prostek, Prostyński, Proszczeński, Proszeński, Proszkowski, Proszyński, Prószkowski, Prószyński, Pruszyński, Przanowski, Przeborowski, Przedwojewski, Przegaliński, Przybysławski, Przydoba, Przyłuski, Przytulski, Ptak, Punikiewski, Punikowski, Pużewicz, Rabaszowski, Raczeński, Raczewski, Raczyński, Radochoński, Radochowski, Radohowski, Radwiłłowicz, Radwiłowicz, Radzimiński, Radzimski, Radziszewski, Radziwiłłowicz, Radziwiłowicz, Radzki, Radzymiński, Rajuńć, Rakowski, Rapacki, Ratyński, Rauschke, Rawłuszkiewicz, Rąbalski, Rąbelski, Rebieleński, Rech, Redko, Redzimiński, Rejczyński, Rembalski, Rembeliński, Rembieliński, Rewieński, Rewiński, Reyczyński, Rębalski, Rębieliński, Robaszewicz, Robaszewski, Roder, Rodowicz, Rodziwiłowicz, Rokicki, Roksenicz, Roksewicz, Roksiewicz, Romanowicz, Romanowicz-Miśliński, Romansewicz, Romaszkiewicz, Roszczewski, Rowicki, Rożycki, Różycki, Rudnicki, Rudowicz, Ruksza, Ruszkowski, Rużycki, Rychlig, Rychlik, Rylewicz, Rymkiewicz, Rynkszelewski, Rynkszylewski, Rytel, Ryttel, Rzepecki, Rzewuski, Rzuchowski. Sadliński, Sadowski, Saliszrowski, Samborski, Samek, Samko, Sammek, Samnicki, Sapieszko, Sarnecki, Sawicki, Sawnor, Sądowski, Sczucki, Seferowicz, Sejbut-Romanowicz, Selski, Serbey, Serbiey, Serek, Serkowski, Serwiński, Sędzicki, Sidorowicz, Sieklicki, Sielatycki, Sielewicz, Sielicki, Sieliski, Sielnicki, Sielski, Siemieński, Siemiński, Sienicki, Sierakowski, Sierbiej, Sierchowski, Sierka, Sierko, Sierkowski, Sierkuciejewski, Sierkuczewski, Sierski, Siewruk, Silpniewski, Sirkowski, Sirotowicz, Sirski, Siuciłło, Skawiński, Skiwski, Skokowski, Skolimowski, Skołdycki, Skrzynecki, Skrzynicki, Skrzyniecki, Skulimowski, Sławiński, Słotyło, Smolakiewicz, Smoszewski, Smuszewski, Sobański, Songajło, Sordakowski, Spendowski, Spędowski, Stacewicz, Stalrowski, Stambrowski, Stangur, Stanowski, Stawecki, Stawicki, Stawięcki, Stawirowski, Stawiski, Stawski, Stefankiewicz, Stogniew, Stojanowski, Storymowicz, Stowerowski, Strecki, Stroniawski, Stroniewski, Strudziński, Strugiewicz, Struginowicz, Strungur, Stryjec, Strzałkowski, Strzemecki, Strzemeski, Strzeszewski, Stulgiński, Stulpin, Stumbrewicz, Stungiewicz, Stunginowicz, Stungur, Stypułkowski, Styrpejko, Suchodolski, Suchorski, Sudziłowski, Sulimierski, Sulimirski, Sulistrowski, Supiński, Surynt, Suski, Syratowicz, Syrpowicz, Syrtowicz, Syrtowt, Syrutowicz, Szadliński, Szafrański, Szantar, Szapko, Szawrowski, Szczefanowicz, Szczucki, Szczutowski, Szczyppa, Szeląga, Szeleszczyński, Szelicki, Szeliski, Szemborski, Szerenkowski, Szernowicz, Szerokowski, Szerypp, Szmatowicz, Szołayd, Szumowski, Szopowski, Szpakowski, Szretter, Sztormowski[potrzebne źródło], Sztrem, Szulmiński, Szumborski, Szuszkiewicz, Szwańsko, Szydłowski, Szymanowski, Szymborski, Szymko, Szymoński. Śmichowski, Śmiechowski, Śniechowski, Świątkowski, Świderski, Świetlikowski, Świński, Świrski. Talko, Tarasiewicz, Tarasow, Targowski, Tarszeński, Tarulewicz, Trojan, Tropiański, Trzemeski, Tulcewicz, Tupalski, Tupica, Tybiszewski, Tyborowski, Tylicki, Tyszkiewicz. Udrzyński, Ujazdowski, Ukryń, Unikowski, Uszycki, Uszyński, Uściński, Uzłowski. Wizerunek herbu Lubicz zamieszczony na XIX wiecznym dokumencie Wadołowski, Walentynowicz, Wardęski, Waszkiewicz, Waśkiewicz, Waśniewski, Waśniowski, Wądołkowski, Wądołowski, Wągl, Wąglowa, Wersocki, Węgrzecki, Widlicki, Wielicki, Wielpiszewski, Wierzbicki, Wierzbowski, Wierzuchowski, Wieszczycki, Wilbik, Wilkowski, Wilpiszewski, Wincza, Wisigiert, Wiszniewski, Witowski, Wittiński, Wizgierd, Wizgiert, Włochowicz, Wodlicki, Wojchowski, Wojciechowski, Wojdowski, Wojnarowicz, Wojtasz, Wojtkiewicz, Wojtkowski, Wojtkuński, Wojtowicz, Wolański, Woliński, Wolski, Wołoczyński, Wołuński, Wołyncewicz, Wołyński, Worłowski, Woroniec, Woroński, Wortkowski, Woytowicz, Wroczeński, Wroczyński, Wroński, Wrotnowski, Wróblewski, Wyczałkowski, Wyczołkowski, Wyganiecki, Wygrażewski, Wygrążewski, Wyperski, Wyrzykowski, Wysocki. Zabłocki, Zaborski, Zacherski, Zachorski, Zadykiewicz, Zadykowicz, Zagorzyczowski, Zagrzewski, Zahorski, Zakrzewski, Zaleski, Zalewski, Zalęski, Zaliwski, Załęski, Załuska, Załuski, Zaniewski, Zaorski, Zapasiewicz, Zapaśnik, Zator, Zborzyński, Zbudzki, Zbysław, Zdzański, Zdzeński, Zdziański, Zdziechowski, Zdzieński, Zegadłowicz, Zembowski, Zembrowski, Zgodziński, Zieliński, Zielonka, Zielonko, Zielonkowski, Zięcint, Zięć, Zlasnowski, Znaniecki, Znawiecki, Zołciński, Zołczyński, Zorzewski, Zwycewicz, Zydowicz, Zygadłowicz, Zylewicz. Żabiński, Żakowski, Żebracki, Żejc, Żeromski, Żewacki, Żewocki, Żochiewski, Żochowski, Żołciński, Żołczyński, Żołkiewski, Żołkowski, Żorzewski, Żółciński, Żółkiewski, Żółkowski, Żudycki, Żułciński, Żydanowicz, Żydowa, Żydowicz, Żydowo, Żygadło, Żylewicz, Żylicz, Żyliński, Żyrmont, Żytkiewicz.

Lubicz (Luba, Lubow, Łuba) is a Polish nobility coat of arms.

== History ==
The earliest known depiction of the arms is a seal of 1348 belonging to Przedbór, starosta of Kuyavia. A second seal, of 1438, belonged to Paweł of Grąbczewo, a canon of Płock. Some heraldists have suggested that Lubicz developed from the Podkowa ("horseshoe") arms by the addition of two crosses.

=== Legend ===
An armorial legend holds that in 1190 a skirmish took place between Mazovian knights and the Prussians beside a river then called Lubicz, now the Drwęca; for his courage and for capturing the enemy commander, a knight bearing the Pobóg arms was granted arms of his own, named after the river. The account is a heraldic legend rather than a documented event: the earliest surviving depiction of the arms postdates it by more than 150 years.

== Blazon ==
Azure, a horseshoe argent, heels to base, surmounted by a cross pattée argent, and a second cross pattée within the horseshoe. Crest: three ostrich feathers. Mantling: azure lined argent.

Kasper Niesiecki, drawing on Bartosz Paprocki, Szymon Okolski and Marcin Bielski, described the arms as "a horseshoe arranged as in Dąbrowa or Pobóg, with two crosses, one on the top of the horseshoe, the other within it; the field should be blue, the crosses white, on the helm three ostrich feathers".

== Notable bearers ==
Notable bearers of this coat of arms include:

- House of Wróblewski
  - Jerzy Wróblewski
  - Andrzej Wróblewski
  - Władysław Wróblewski
  - Zygmunt Florenty Wróblewski
- House of Żółkiewski
  - Stanisław Żółkiewski
- Gruszecki family
  - Agafya Grushetskaya - Tsaritsa of Russia
- Adam Adamandy Kochański
- Oscar Milosz (Oscar Vladislas de Lubicz-Milosz)
- Czesław Miłosz
- Ściapan Niekraševič
- Nikolai Gogol
- Zygmunt Lubicz Zaleski
- Tadeusz Wladyslaw Konopka (stage name Ted Knight)
- Witold Lesiewicz
- Elżbieta Szydłowska
- House of Wojtowicz
- Martin Zaniewski
- Piotr Tylicki (1543–1616), Polish bishop

== Gallery ==
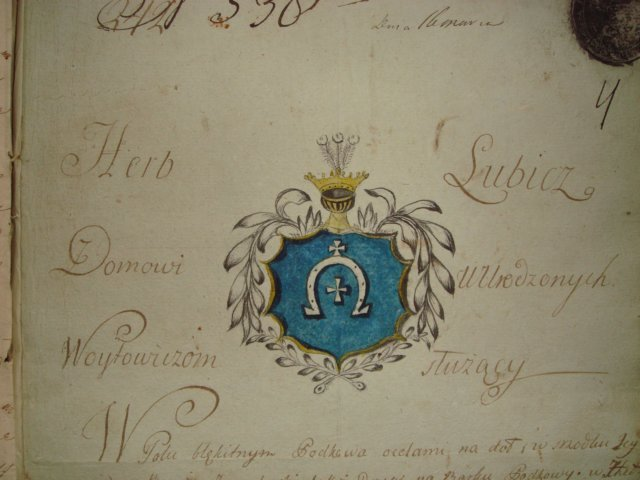
Lubicz on a 19th-century document of the Family of Wojtowicz.

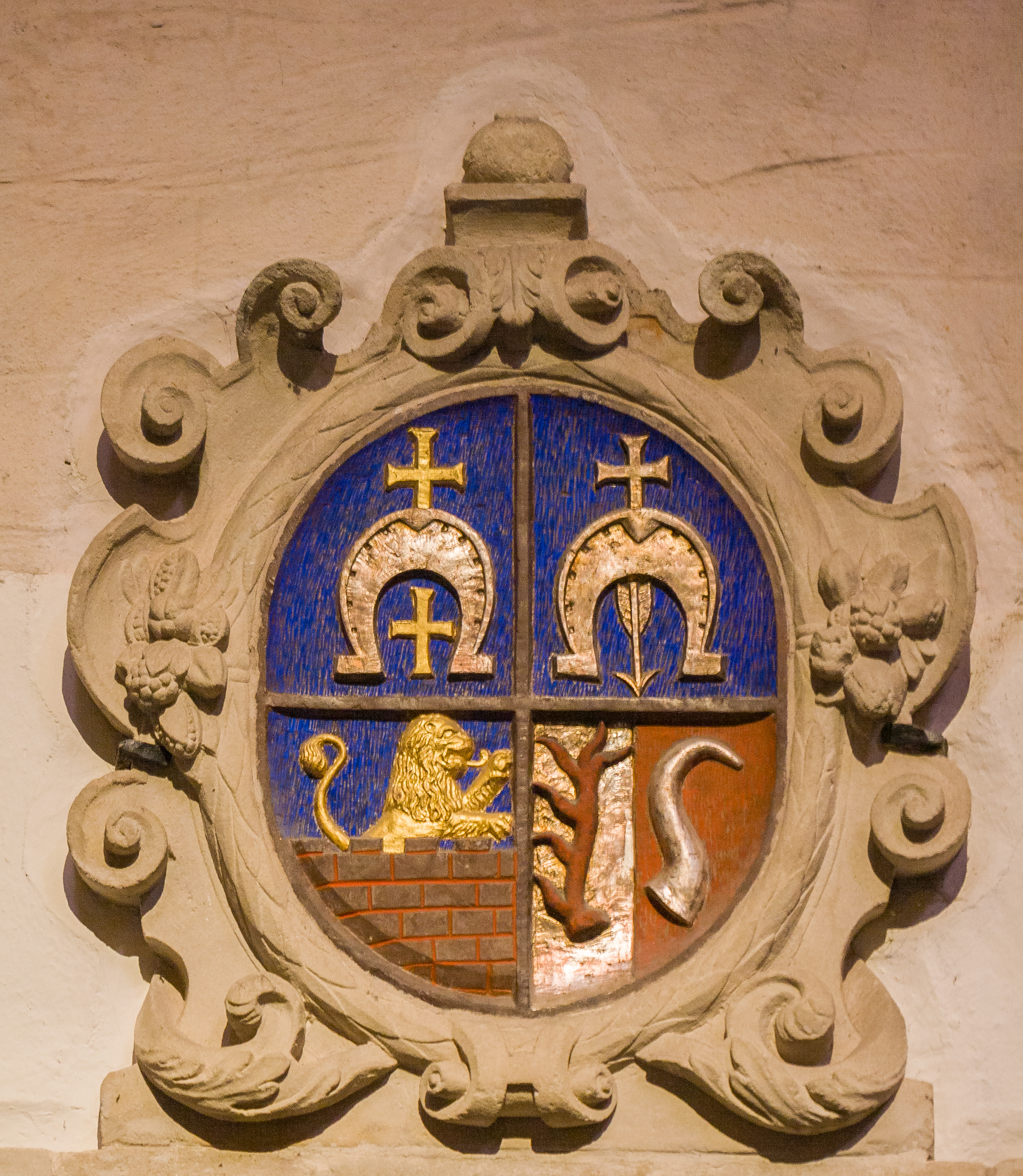
Coat of arms in the Gniezno Cathedral, Gniezno.

== Related coat of arms ==
- Krzywda coat of arms
- Pobóg coat of arms

== See also ==
- Polish heraldry
- Heraldic family
- List of Polish nobility coats of arms
- House of Wojtowicz

== Bibliography ==
- Tadeusz Gajl: Herbarz polski od średniowiecza do XX wieku : ponad 4500 herbów szlacheckich 37 tysięcy nazwisk 55 tysięcy rodów. L&L, 2007. ISBN 978-83-60597-10-1.
- Encyklopedia Multimedialna PWN, cz. 4. Historia
- Sławomir Górzyński, Jerzy Kochanowski Herby szlachty polskiej, Warszawa 1990, s. 96–98
- Kasper Niesiecki: Herbarz polski, vol. VI. Leipzig: Breitkopf i Haertel, 1841.
- Alfred Znamierowski: Herbarz rodowy. Warsaw: Świat Książki, 2004. ISBN 83-7391-166-9.
