= Pobóg coat of arms =

Polish coat of arms

Pobóg
- Battle cry: Pobodze
- Alternative name(s): Pobodze, Pobog, Pobożanie, Pobożanicz, Pobożany, Pobożenie, Pobożeny
- Earliest mention: 1353 (seal), 1403 (record)
- Families: 652 names A Abakowski, Adamczewski, Adamczowski, Adomczowski, Alchimowicz, Andrykowicz, Andrzejkiewicz, Andrzejkowicz. B Baban, Baciuszkiewicz, Badan, Barański, Barczewski, Bazyliski, Belicki, Benisławski, Beniuszewicz, Będzisławski, Bęklewski, Białopolski, Bielicki, Bielski, Bienięda, Bieńkiewicz, Biernatowicz, Błomiński, Boban, Bobrowski, Bogor, Bolesta, Boniuszewicz, Bońko, Bornieszewicz, Bromierski, Bromirski, Bronak, Bronakowski, Bronicki, Broniowski, Brudziński, Brumierski, Brzeski, Budrecki, Budrewicz, Budziszewski, Burniewicz, Burzymski, Burzyński, Butkowski, Byczyński, Bylicki. C Caławański, Całowański, Cebrowski, Centkowski, Certowicz, Cetkowski, Cętkowski, Chabielski, Chmielewski, Chodaczyński, Chomicki, Chomiczewski, Chomiński, Chorwat, Chuchrowski, Chudzewski, Ciekliński, Ciepławski, Ciepłowski, Cieszkowski, Cięszkowski, Ciszkowski, Cybulski, Czachowski, Czapkiewicz, Czaplewicz, Czaplicki, Czarnecki, Czarnowski, Czarnożyński, Czartowicz, Czenstkowski, Czerniowski, Czertowicz, Czetkowski, Częstkowski, Czortowicz, Czyżewski, Czyżowski. D Daćbóg, Dadzibog, Dadzibogowski, Dadzibóg, Darguż, Dargużewicz, Dąbrowski, Długołęcki, Dłużewski, Dmochowski, Dmowski, Dmuchowski, Dobieski, Domanikowski, Domaszewicz, Domatewicz, Domiszewicz, Domiszewski, Doschot, Downar, Drewnowski, Drozdowski, Droziński, Drusejko-Różewicz, Duchnowski, Dulębiański, Duszewski, Duszkiewicz, Duszyński, Dworycki, Dychowicz, Dymlina, Dymowski, Działyński, Dziengełł. E Ejnik, Elert, Ertel, Esmanowicz, Eynik. F Falewicz, Faliszewski, Faliszowski, Federowicz, Fedorowicz, Fiackiewicz, Fijałkowski, Filemonowicz, Filewski, Filimanowicz, Filipiewski, Filipkowski, Filipowicz, Filipowski, Filonowicz, Franckiewicz, Fryczyński. G Gadziński, Gardliński, Garlikowski, Garliński, Gbelski, Gebelski, Genkiewicz, Giedygołgowicz, Giemza, Gienkiewicz, Ginczewski, Ginkiewicz, Gintowski, Gizilewicz, Gładysz, Głuskowski, Głuszkowski, Gnatowski, Gołyński, Gorski, Goszczyński, Gościcki, Gościński, Gotkowski, Górski, Grabowski, Grymowicz, Grzod, Grzybowski, Gszod, Gudowicz, Gumowski, Gurski, Gutkowski, Gwozdecki. H Halo, Herman, Horwat, Horwatt, Hrymowicz, Hudowicz. I Iskrzycki, Iwanowicz, Iwanowski. J Jachimowicz, Jackowski, Jakowicki, Jamentowicz, Jamont, Jamonth, Jamontowicz, Janikowski, Janiński, Janiszewski, Jankowicki, Jankowski, Janowski, Januszewicz, Januszewski, Januszkowski, Januszowski, Jastrzembowski, Jastrzębowski, Jawor, Jaworowski, Jawór, Jemielita, Jemielity, Jemielski, Jundził, Jundziłł, Jursza. K Kalo, Kałdowski, Kałotowski, Kałuski, Karski, Kędzierzyński, Kielanowski, Kiernożycki, Kiersnowski, Kierzkowski, Kierznowski, Kilanowski, Kilijanowski, Kirzniowski, Klewicki, Kobylin-Filipowicz, Kobyliński, Kobylski, Kocięcki, Kocięski, Kołbielski, Kołotowski, Komorowski, Konarzewski, Konarzowski, Konaszewicz, Koniecpolski, Koparzewski, Kopokuszski, Korkosz, Korkoz, Korkoza, Korybski, Korzybski, Kosiarowski, Kosobucki, Kossobucki, Kossobudzki, Kostkowski, Kotlewicz, Kotowski, Kozarzewski, Kożuszkowski, Krasnodębski, Krasnosielecki, Krasnosielski, Krompolc, Krompole, Krotycz, Krusz, Krusza, Kruszeński, Kruszewski, Kruszyński, Krzykowski, Księski, Kubiłojć, Kucewicz, Kucharski, Kucicki, Kukowski, Kulczykowski, Kumin, Kursz, Kutlewski. L Lakon, Laliński, Lawski, Lebiecki, Lemi, Lenartowicz, Lenkiewicz, Lenkowski, Leszczyński, Lewandowski, Lganowski, Liberadzki, Liboradzki, Lichowski, Liczkun, Lindyk, Lindzki, Lipski, Liszkun, Lizkun, Lubas, Luberadzki, Lubnicki, Luboradzki, Lubowiecki, Lubowiedzki. Ł Łaniecki, Ławiński, Ławski, Łękawski, Łubnicki. M Maciejowski, Mackiewicz, Mackowicz, Maćkiewicz, Magiera, Majkowski, Malawski, Malewski, Malinowski, Marciszewski, Maskotka, Massejn, Massejna, Mazurkiewicz, Merecki, Micewicz, Michnicki, Michniewicz, Miecznikowski, Miedwiecki, Miedzwiecki, Miedzwiedzki, Miedźwiecki, Miedźwiedzki, Miewoyna, Miewoyno, Mikałowski, Miłkowski, Mirciszewski, Moderowski, Mokowski, Moniuszko, Monstwił, Monstwiłło, Montrym, Muchowiecki, Musztafa, Musztaffa. N Nasiłowski, Nawrocki, Nawrucki, Nesterowicz, Niedroski, Niedrowski, Niedźwiecki, Niedźwiedzki, Niementowski, Nieprowski, Nieprski, Niesterowicz, Niestorowicz, Niesułowski, Niesułtowski, Nowicki, Nowowiejski. O Okrzycki, Okszycki, Olganowski, Olszamowski, Olszanowski, Olszewski, Onikijewicz, Orecki, Orzecki, Orzeszko, Orzęcki, Osiecki, Osmolski, Osmólski, Ozepowski, Ożepowski. P Pagowski, Pakosz, Pakoszewski, Pakoszowski, Palinowski, Pankiewicz, Pańkiewicz, Pągowski, Pelwelski, Penczyński, Perdzyński, Petrulewicz, Petrykowicz, Pętliński, Pierzchalski, Pierzynowski, Pietraszewicz, Piłwo, Pirog, Pirok, Pisczało, Piszczałło, Piszczało, Płomieński, Płomiński, Pobojewski, Pobożanin, Pocernacki, Podgórski, Podhajecki, Podhajski, Podrzecki, Pogierski, Pogirski, Polanowski, Poleski, Polewicz, Połjanowski, Półjanowski, Połomski, Pomarzański, Ponikwicki, Popowski, Poradowski, Poziemecki, Proniewicz, Prusinowski, Pruszyński, Pryszmont, Pryszmony, Pryzkint, Pryżgint, Puchalski, Pujkowski, Putkowski. R Rab, Racewicz, Rachimowicz, Rachlewicz, Rackiewicz, Raczkiewicz, Raczyc, Radczyc, Radkiewicz, Radomski, Radomyski, Radziszewski, Raksimowicz, Rało, Rało-Kalon, Rasimowicz, Ratomski, Rechlewicz, Remiesz, Remiński, Remiszewski, Remiszowski, Rodkiewicz, Rodziewicz, Roksicki, Rokszycki, Romanowicz, Rossocki, Rossowski, Rostkowski, Rotkiewicz, Rożyński, Różewicz, Ruchow, Rucicki, Rudkiewicz, Rudkowski, Rusicki, Ruszkowski, Rutkowski, Rychalski, Rychlewicz, Rychwalski, Rydzewicz, Rydziewicz, Rymaszewski, Rymiński, Rymkiewicz, Rymkowicz, Rymowicz, Rymtowt, Ryntoft, Ryntowt. S Sakowicz, Sarzyński, Sczadrowski, Sczucki, Serafinowicz, Sklińsmont, Skrzeczowski, Słotowski, Smoleński, Sokołowicz, Sowgowicz, Stachórski, Stachurski, Stanek, Stanisławski, Staniszewski, Stanko, Starczewski, Stawiski, Stawiszewski, Stecewicz, Stosza, Strugiewicz, Strus, Strzemień, Strzeszewski, Studniarski, Stungiewicz, Suchodolski, Sudyka, Sułkowski, Sumorok, Surgulewski, Surocki, Sutkiewicz, Sutkowski, Sutocki, Sutowski, Swobodecki, Szankowski, Szańkowski, Szarkowski, Szczawieński, Szcząsnowicz, Szczepkowski, Szcześnieski, Szczesniak Szcześniewski, Szczęsnowicz, Szczęsnowski, Szczucki, Szczuka, Szczukocki, Szeptycki, Szpiganowicz, Szukiewicz, Szulborski, Szulc, Szydłowski, Szyjski, Szymoński, Szyski. Ś Świątkowski, Świętochowski. T Tercikowski, Terczykowski, Terejkowski, Tereykowski, Tołłoczko, Tołoczkiewicz, Tołoczko, Trojecki, Trusewicz, Tryczyński, Trzciński, Tuchowski U Udrzyński, Ulaszowski, Uleński, Uszyński, Utiachowski, Użechowski, Użochowski W Walentynowicz, Wałdowski, Wardomski, Warmski, Wasilewski, Waśniewski, Wersocki, Wierchowski, Wierzchowski, Więckiewicz, Więckowicz, Wikun, Wilkocki, Wilkowski, Wodoradzki, Wodziralski, Wojczyk, Wojdak, Wójcik, Wolski, Wołk, Woydag, Wulf, Wyżga Z Zaborowski, Zachwatowicz, Zadarka, Zadatka, Zajaszewicz, Zajączkowski, Zakrzewski, Zaleski, Załęski, Zapolski, Zarzecki, Zarzycki, Zbierski, Zbyszyński, Zdanowicz, Zdzieszyński, Zegwirski, Zengoński, Zengwirski, Zerański, Zęngwirski, Zgaździński, Zgażdziński, Zgleczyński, Zgliczyński, Zgliszyński, Zinkiewicz, Ziołecki, Złotkowski, Zonczewski, Zublewicz, Zublewski, Zygmuntowicz. Ż Żabowicz, Żabowski, Żadeyko, Żalgiewicz, Żarnowski, Żebenko, Żebienko, Żerakowski, Żerański, Żeromski, Żongołłowicz, Żoromski, Żórowski, Żuk, Żurawski, Żurowski, Żylewicz, Żyrowski.

Pobóg is a Polish coat of arms that was used by many noble families in medieval Poland and later under the Polish–Lithuanian Commonwealth.

== History ==
Research by professional analysts using references such as "Herbarz Polski" by Kaspar Niesiecki, "Herbarz Polski" by Adam Boniecki, "Herby Rodów Polskich" and "Rycerstwo polskie wieków średnich" by Professor F. Piekosiński revealed that the Pobóg origins trace back to the forming of tribal clans probably established by Goths in 150 AD. The system was associated with the ancient Slavonic family community structure and Sarmatian family system. In the struggles for control over agricultural soil, the feudal clan system evolved as the best defense against invaders sweeping in from the east and west.

According to legend strongly supported by Professor F. Piekosiński, the Pobóg-Pobodze clan is a junior branch of the Popielid dynasty, which ruled Poland from the 7th through 9th centuries, before the Bolescic-Piast dynasty (9th to 14th centuries), another junior branch of the Popielid dynasty. The Popielids-Pobóg clan is part of the senior branch of the Popielid dynasty, the Ogończyk clan, as Polish clan history research by Piekosiński suggests.

The Pobóg name was most likely formed from the proclamation Pobodze, call "wishing" in old Polish Po Bodze ("may God keep you in His care"). In oldest judicial records it is found in that form precisely. Proclamation Pobóg appear in family in 16th century. Other historians claim that the name Pobóg derived from the name of this Bug River. In this statement Pobóg means "after Bug". They placed the Pobóg clan's ancient territory around the Bug River in North-East Malopolska (Lesser Poland). So, estates in Małopolska were just one portion of the clan territories.

The medieval version of Pobóg coat of arms from seal of Grand Chancellor of the Crown Jan of Koniecpol in 1435.

The great families of the Pobóg clan reached noble status for their services to prince, faith and community as warriors and scholars. They later become even more prominent as numerous branches of the same house acquired distant estates, some of which were located in other countries. From the 12th century onwards, this ancient clan was identified with the great social and economic evolution which made this territory a landmark contributor to the development of the nation in the 14th century. Pobóg clan participated in the victorious crusade against pagan Prussians and Yotvingians tribes in 1190 under the command of prince Casimir II the Just. One clan member became famous for personally taking pagan commander prisoner. In 1331 the Pobóg clan participated in a victorious battle at Płowce against Teutonic Order. In 1359, at Poloniny (Polonini) against Moldavian army. In 1410 Pobóg clan participated under its own colours in the biggest and most famous battle in Europe at this time, at Grunwald (Tannenberg), where the Polish and Lithuanian armies were victorious against the Teutonic Order. The families' warriors were led by Jakub of Koniecpol, palatinus of Sieradz. In 1413 in Horodło (during the signing of the Union of Lublin), Pobóg clan represented by Jakub of Koniecpol and Piotr of Popow had adopted Lithuanian boyar Rało.

Jan Długosz, main Polish mediaeval historian (about 1460 AD), wrote of the Pobóg clan that they were "ad iracundiam proni" ("prone to anger"). According to the work of Jan Długosz and some other documents, the Pobóg coat of arms had in the beginning of 15th century another image.

With the Teutonic Order of Knights pushing from the north and Tartars from the east, the clans fought to position themselves for best survival and trade by forming alliances with families in neighbouring countries.

Casimir IV Jagiellon became the Grand Duke of Lithuania in 1447, consolidating the two nations, and the clan built many castles during the next century against Turks, Tartars and Muscovites, who became a peril.

The Pobóg clan of families continued to make important contributions to the life of Europe in the middle and later. From the 15th century onwards they held significant positions of prestige and power becoming involved in tribal struggles for supremacy, and branched into Pomorze (Pomerania), Russia, Latvia, Lithuania and also Moravia, Hungary and Moldavia. Notable from this time amongst the Clans of Poland was the ancient Pobóg clan of families.

== Famous Ancestors ==
Stefan was archbishop of Gniezno. At Stefan's, instigation the sejm was called in Gniezno at which it was decided to bring Kazimierz from the Cluniac monastery and put him on his father's throne, to which end they would not stint their work and efforts. He then went to Rome and asked Pope Benedict IX to release Kazimierz from his monastic vows and profession; then in Cluny he labored to talk Kazimierz into assuming the throne of Poland. Kazimierz bowed to his pleas and persuasions, and Stefan accompanied him back to Poland and crowned him and his wife, kin to the Ruthenian princes; and he also placed the crown on Boleslaw the Bold after him. He brought a lawsuit against the Bohemians over the pillaging of Poland and especially of the Gniezno cathedral, but he gained little from this. Death overtook him during these efforts in 1059.

Paprocki in "Gniazdo cnoty" mentions Bolesta, cup-bearer to king Kazimierz, in 1080. The same author writes on the basis of Czyrzyce monastery lists that Stefan, Kraków palatinus (duke), was flourishing in 1145. Paprocki, after Kromer, lists another Bolesta, castellan of Wizna, who held a certain part of the administration in Prussia in 1167, in the days of Bolesław IV the Curly. His son was supposedly the first starosta (count) of Płock. In the same place he read of Florjan, palatinus (duke) of Sandomierz died in 1243. Comes (count) Msciwoj sealed a document in Pobóg coat of arms in 1231 and 1235. His son was Mikolaj palatinus (duke) of Kraków. Other Pobóg's Adam was Kraków castellan in 1260. Paprocki also includes Jakob, Sieradz castellan, here; according to him, Jakób was the father of Piotr, bishop of Płock, who died in 1263. Bernard, also bishop of Płock was a member of Pobóg clan also. Wolmir, bishop of Kujawy, in „Lives of the Kujawy" by bishop Darnalewski states that he was a Pobóg; from pastor of Kruszwica to Kujawy canon, he was chosen by the chapter for the see in 1258; he was chancellor under the Mazovian princes Ziemowit and Kazimierz. He suffered many wrongs at the hands of Swietopelk, prince of Pomerania, and had many quarrels with Kazimierz, prince of Łęczyca and Kujawy, when he laid upon him the censure of the church; many estates went to the Kujawy church, both bought by him and bestowed by various lords. Having successfully established the border between his diocese and that of Chełmno, he died in 1271. Damalewski numbers Swietosław, bishop of Poznań, among the Pobógs. Bolesta, Mazovian general starosta (count), is on a letter of Mazovian prince Jan in 1387, as shown in Paprocki's "O herbach". (IMPW)

== Blazon ==
Azure, a horse-shoe argent with a cross formed of the same charged on the edge of its arch. Helmet with mantling azure, lined argent. Crowned. Crest: a demi greyhound rampant, collared and leashed, all proper.

== Notable bearers ==
Notable bearers of this coat of arms include:

- Koniecpolski family
  - Stanisław Koniecpolski
- Petro Konashevych-Sahaidachny
- Władysław Pobóg-Malinowski
- Przemysław Pobóg-Zarzecki
- Leszek Wierzchowski
- Teofil Lenartowicz
- Roman Dmowski
- Frańciszek Ksawery Dmochowski
- Seweryn Goszczyński
- Władysław Raczkiewicz
- Anna Pobóg-Lenartowicz
- Jan Lechoń (Leszek Serafinowicz)
- Leopold Pobóg-Kielanowski
- Andrzej Tadeusz Mazurkiewicz
- Aleksander Polanowski
- Vasili Stepanovich Popov-Popowski
- Jakub Fryczyński h. Pobóg Polski Słownik Biograficzny t. 7 s. 156 FRYCZYŃSKI Jakub (ok. 1720- po 1778) plenipotent Karola Radziwiłła
- Todtleben

== See also ==
- Polish heraldry
- Heraldic family
- List of Polish nobility coats of arms

== Bibliography ==
- Tadeusz Gajl: Polish armorial from the Middle Ages to the 20th century: over 4,500 coats of arms of nobility 37,000 names of 55,000 families. L&L, 2007. ISBN 978-83-60597-10-1
