= Church of Saints Apostles Peter and Paul, Kraków =

Roman Catholic church in Kraków, Poland

Coordinates: 50.0569°N 19.9390°E

Church of Saints Apostles Peter and Paul
- Kościół Świętych Apostołów Piotra i Pawła
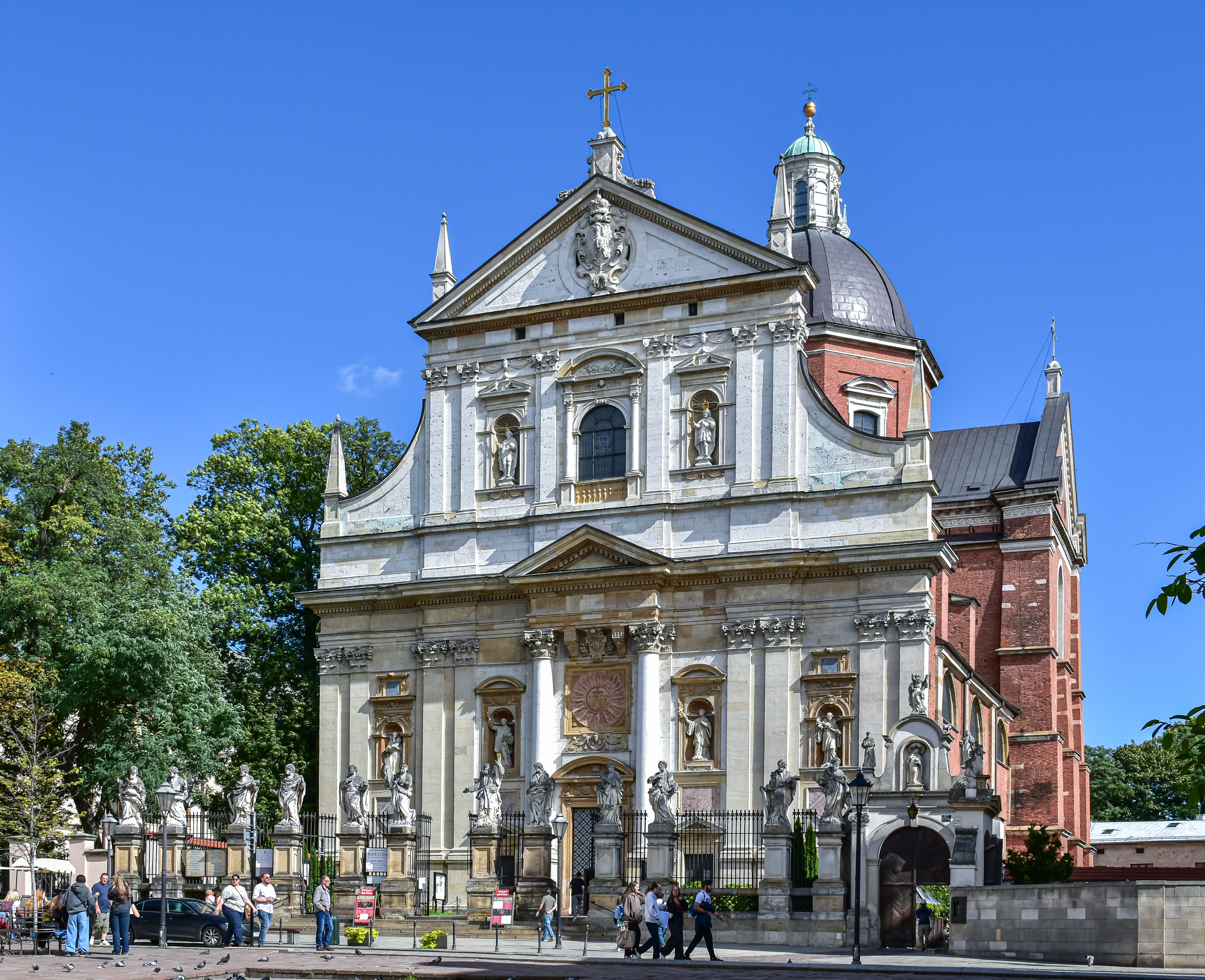
- View of church from the St. Maria Magdalena Square
- Church of Saints Apostles Peter and Paul
- Location: 52a Grodzka Street; Kraków
- Country: Poland
- Denomination: Roman Catholic
- Website: All Saints Parish

History
- Founder: Sigismund III Vasa
- Consecrated: 8 July 1635

Architecture
- Architect(s): Giovanni Maria Bernardoni; Giovanni de Rossis; Józef Britius; Giovanni Trevano
- Style: Baroque
- Groundbreaking: 1597
- Completed: 1619

Specifications
- Materials: Brick and stone

Administration
- Archdiocese: Kraków

UNESCO World Heritage Site
- Type: Cultural
- Criteria: iv
- Designated: 1978
- Part of: Historic Centre of Kraków
- Reference no.: 29bis

Historic Monument of Poland
- Designated: 1994-09-08
- Part of: Kraków historical city complex
- Reference no.: M.P. 1994 nr 50 poz. 418

The Church of Saints Apostles Peter and Paul (Polish: Kościół Świętych Apostołów Piotra i Pawła) is a historic Roman Catholic Polish Baroque church located at 52a Grodzka Street in the Old Town of Kraków, Poland.

It was built between 1597 and 1619 by Giovanni Maria Bernardoni, who perfected the original design of Józef Britius. It is the biggest of the historic churches of Kraków in terms of seating capacity. Since 1842 it has served the Catholic All Saints parish.

== History ==
The Church of Saints Peter and Paul is the first structure in Kraków designed entirely in the Baroque style, and perhaps the first Baroque building in present-day Poland. It was funded by the King Sigismund III Vasa (Zygmunt III) for the Jesuit order. The plan of the church as a cruciform basilica was drafted by an Italian architect Giovanni de Rossi. His design was carried out by Józef Britius at first (from 1597), and then modified by Giovanni Maria Bernardoni. The final shape of the present-day façade, the dome and its Baroque interior is the work of Giovanni Battista Trevano, who completed them in the years 1605–1619. The Church was ceremonially consecrated on 8 July 1635.

Since 1842, it has belonged to the Roman Catholic All Saints parish. In 1960 the church was raised to the rank of the Smaller Basilica.

== Architectural form ==
The facade of Saints Peter and Paul Basilica was constructed with dolomite. It resembles that of the Church of Santa Susanna in Rome by Carlo Maderno, but also, it contains similarities with the facade of the main Jesuit church of Il Gesù. In its niches are statues of Jesuit saints: Ignatius of Loyola, Francis Xavier, Aloysius Gonzaga, and Stanisław Kostka made by Dawid Heel. Above the main portal lies the emblem of the order of Jesuits with Saints Sigismund of Burgundy and Ladislaus I of Hungary. The very top of the facade is adorned with the coat of arms of the Vasa dynasty since King Sigismund III Vasa was the founder of the church. The church interior has a broad, single-nave with two aisles consisting of chapels, as well as the transept with a dome at the intersection, and a short rectangular chancel around the altar, with a semicircular apse covered with a hemispherical vault.

In front of the church grounds there are several plinths with raised sculptures of apostles designed by Kacper Bażanka. They were made with Pińczów limestone, and completed in 1722 by Dawid Heel. Today, in place of the original 18th century statues, which were very much damaged by acid rain, there are contemporary copies made of the same material by Kazimierz Jęczmyk.

=== Interior design ===
Stucco decorations of the interior, mainly on overhead vaults, belong to Giovanni Battista Falconi of Milan who spent most of his adult life working in Poland. In the apse of the presbytery, there are also his scenes from the life and death of Saints Peter and Paul, and the statues of patrons of Poland – Saint Wojciech and Saint Stanisław. In the aisles, his artwork becomes much more joyous and include figures of angelic putti woven into ornamental compositions and plafonds.

The late Baroque high altar from 1735 with the image of Józef Brodowski "giving keys to St. Peter" was designed by Kacper Bażanka. Among the accessories in the interior, a sarcophagus of the Bishop Andrzej Trzebicki from late 17th century stands out prominently, as well as the receptacles of Branicki family (from 1720–1725) and Brzechffs, from 1716 by Bażanka. The interior lighting is subordinate to the Baroque dramatization of liturgy and focussed on the priest celebrating Holy Mass. The side pillars supporting the dome were supposed to create the impression of a theatre stage inside. In 1638 the Jesuits formed a musical ensemble there, the biggest in contemporary Poland. It featured around 80 to 100 singers. In the basement beneath the floor of the church Rev. Piotr Skarga is buried. Most recently, beginning January 2010, works proceeded on creating the National Pantheon in the Church's vaults.

== Foucault pendulum ==
Every Thursday inside the Church, demonstrations are held of the longest Foucault pendulum in Poland (46,5 m), suspended for the popular display of the Earth's rotation. Named after the French physicist Léon Foucault, the experimental apparatus consists of a tall pendulum free to swing in any vertical plane. The actual path of the swing appears to rotate—while in fact the plane is fixed in space, but the Earth rotates under the pendulum once a sidereal day. It is a simple and easy-to-see proof of the Earth's movement. The pendulum weights 25 kg and is fitted with the red laser marking a clock face at the floor. It takes about an hour to notice a significant difference in its path, and the explanation is provided in Polish.

The history of the pendulum at the Church is several decades long. For the first time, it was hung in 1949 on the initiative of professors Kazimierz Kordylewski and Władysław Horbacki. It was put on display again in 1991 on the anniversary of the arrival of Nicolaus Copernicus in the city. However, the renovations two years later required that the pendulum be taken down. In 2000, said Dr Henryk Brancewicz, astronomer at the Jagiellonian University, a local daredevil clambered from the outside and again hung the string in the telescope of the dome.

== Notable people buried at the Saints Peter and Paul Church ==
The Church of Saint Peter and Paul hosts one of Poland's National Pantheons (Panteon Narodowy) alongside the Wawel Cathedral, St. John's Archcathedral and the Church of St Michael the Archangel and St Stanislaus the Bishop and Martyr, a burial place of the most distinguished Poles representing the fields of the arts, culture and science. The work on the construction of the pantheon began in October 2010 and the official opening of the first part of the complex took place in 2012 on the 400th anniversary of Piotr Skarga's death whose remains were kept in one of the church's crypts.

People interred at the pantheon include:

- Piotr Skarga, (1536–1612), Jesuit preacher
- Andrzej Trzebicki, (1607–1679), nobleman and priest
- Witold Szeliga Bieliński, (1818–1833), nobleman
- Sławomir Mrożek, (1930–2013), dramatist and cartoonist
- Karol Olszewski, (1846–1915), chemist
- Krzysztof Penderecki (1933–2020), composer and conductor
- Marian Rejewski, (1905–1980), mathematician and cryptologist
- Jerzy Różycki, (1909–1942), mathematician and cryptologist
- Zygmunt Wróblewski, (1845–1888), chemist
- Henryk Zygalski, (1908–1978), mathematician and cryptologist

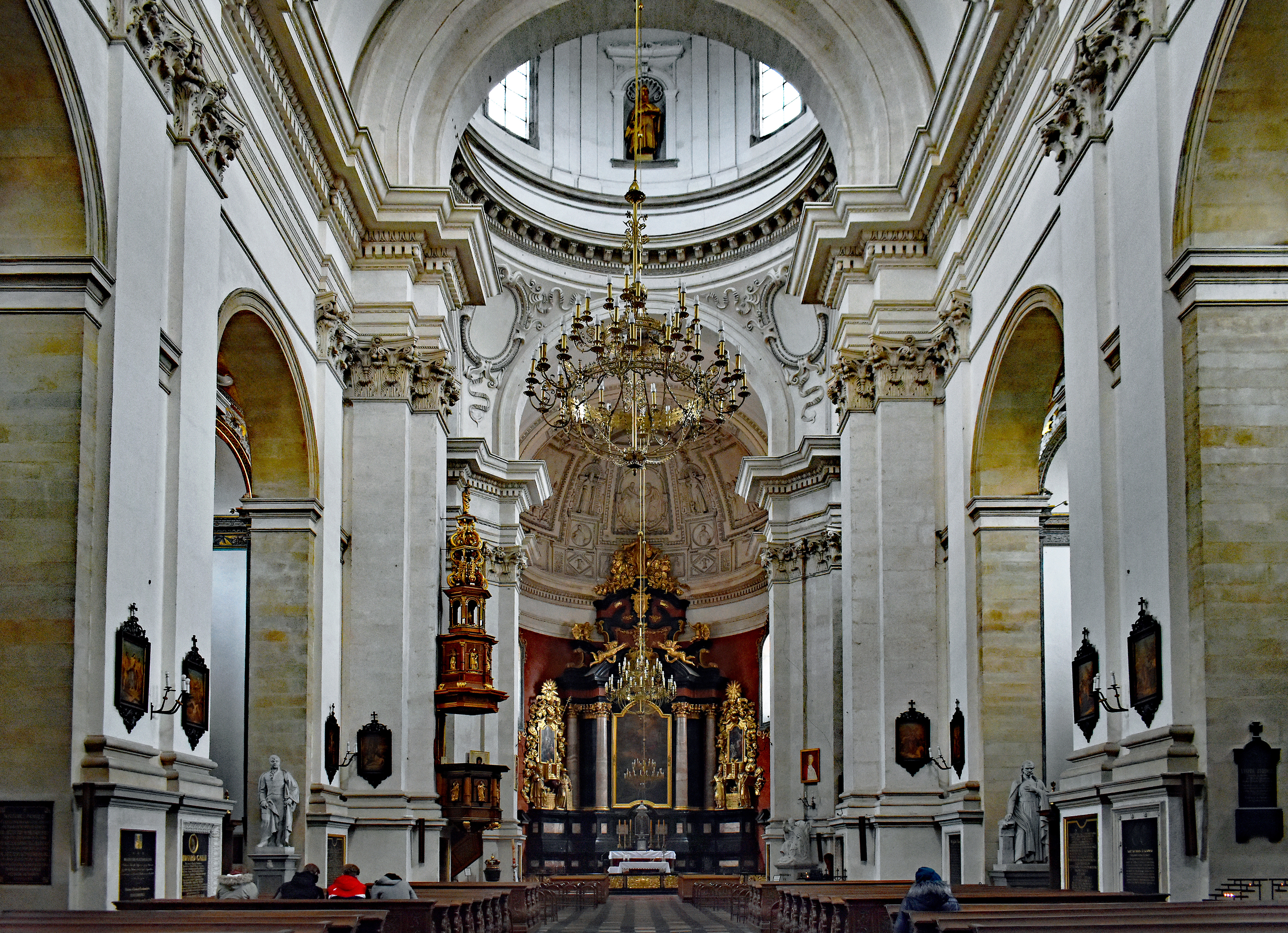
Main nave

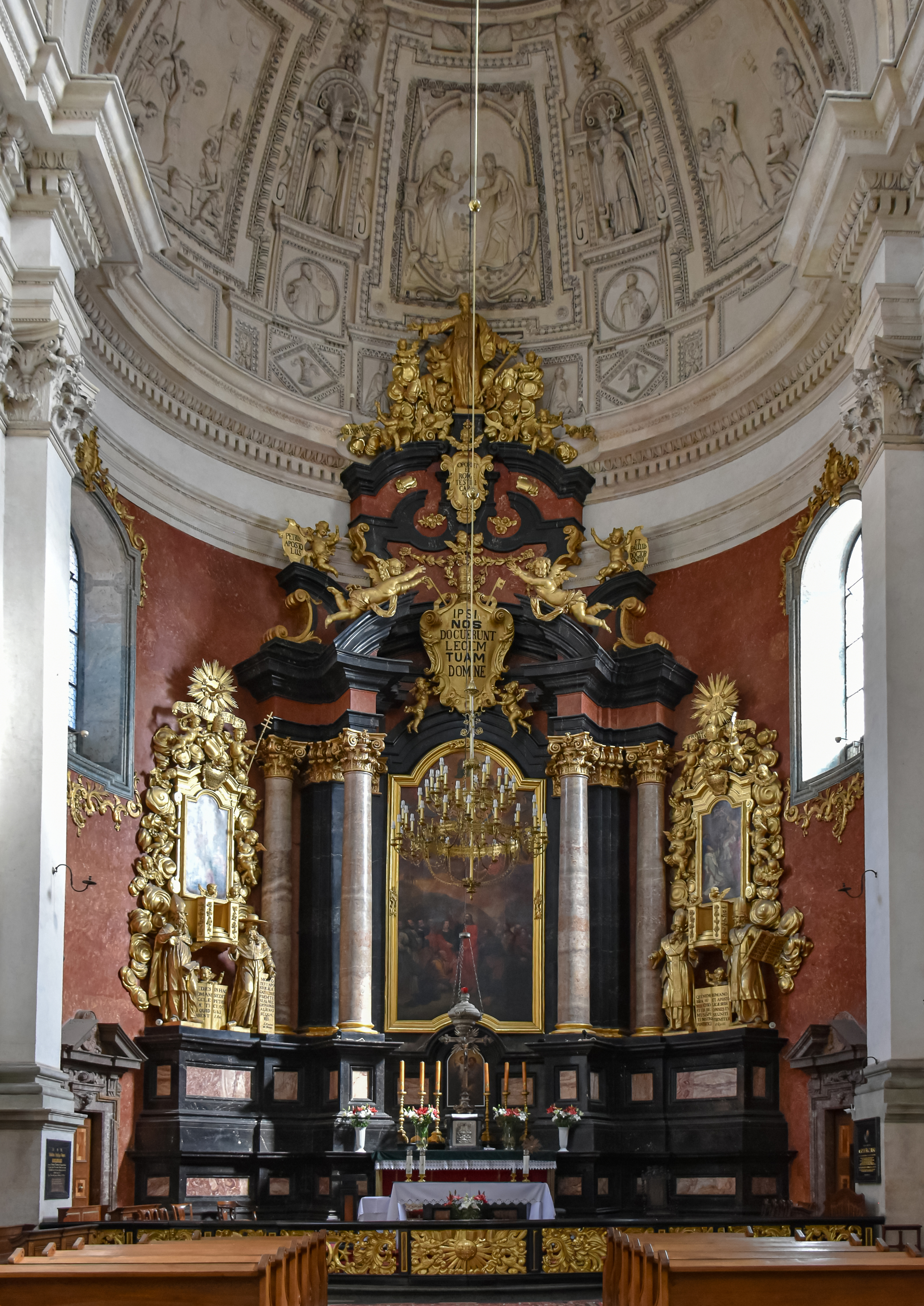
Main altar

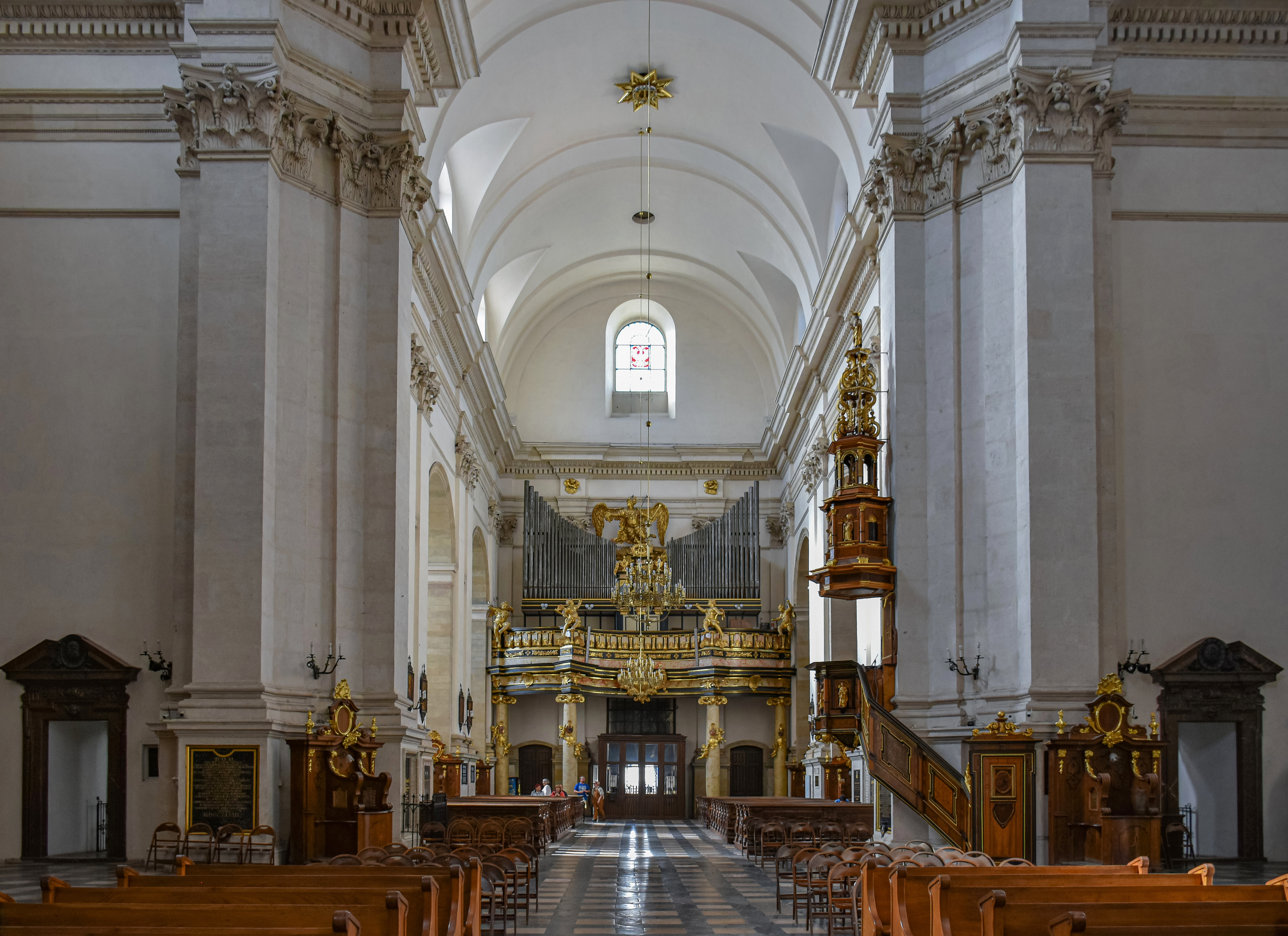
Choir and pipe organ

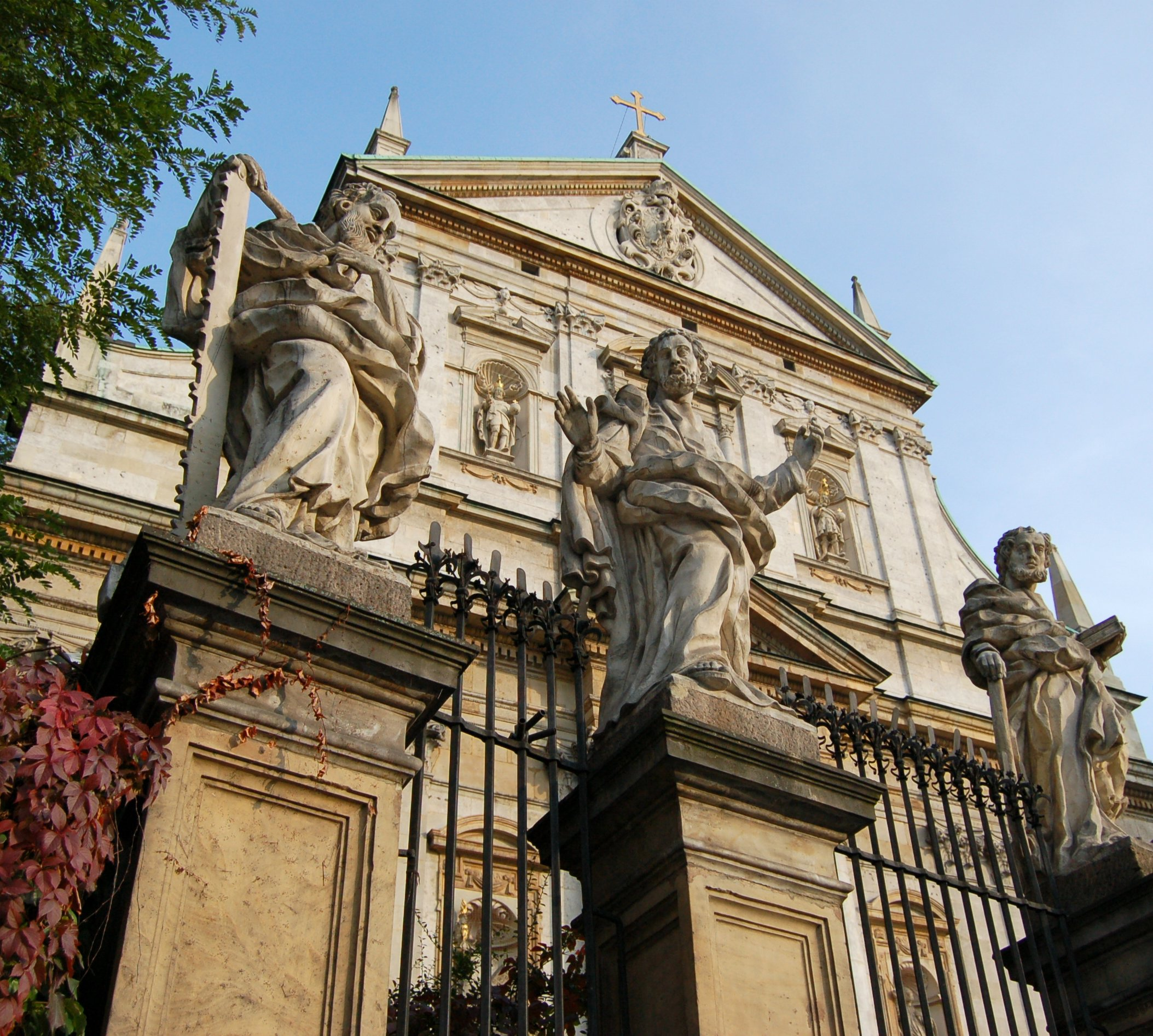
The statues of Saints

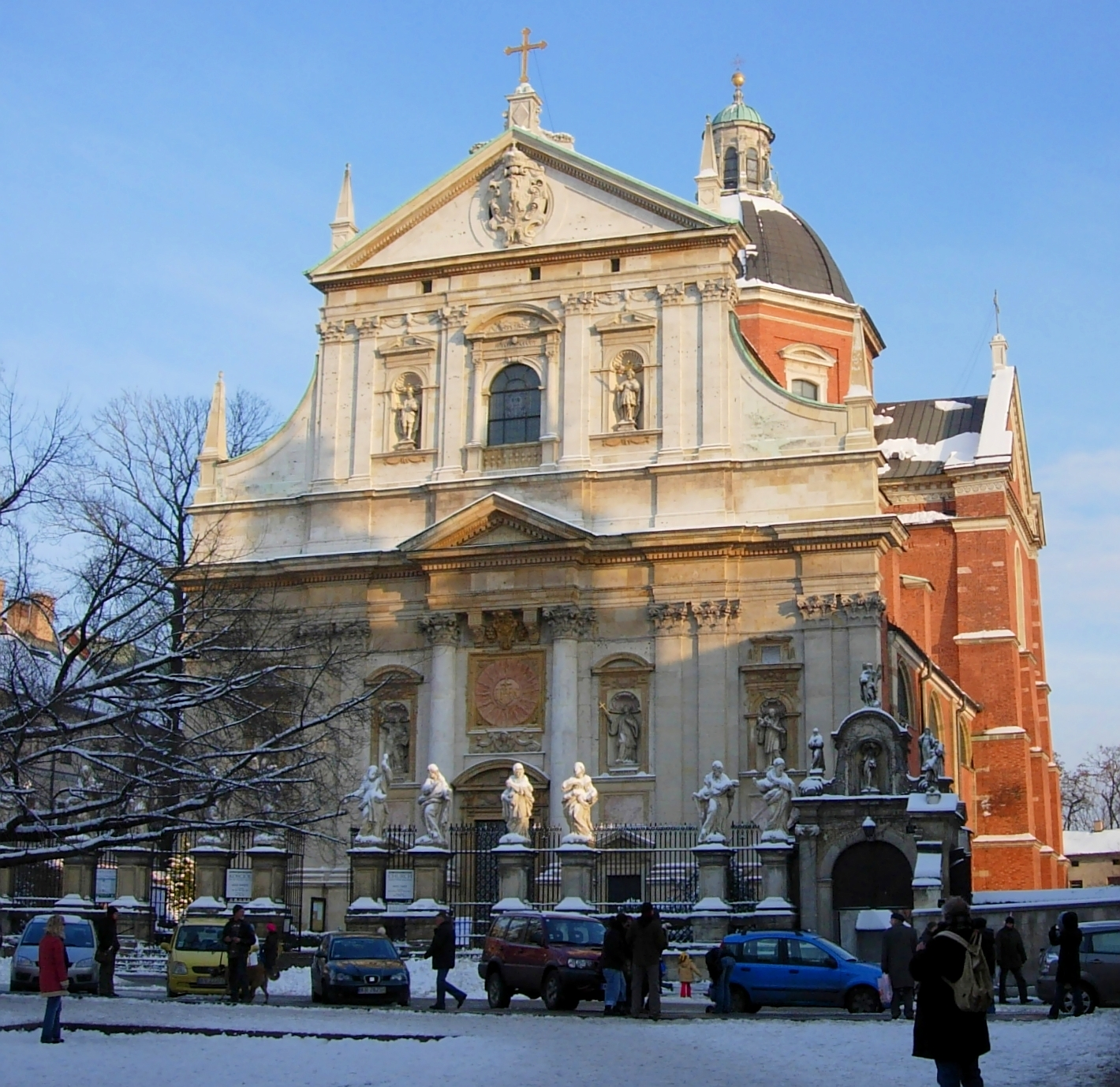
The winter-time facade

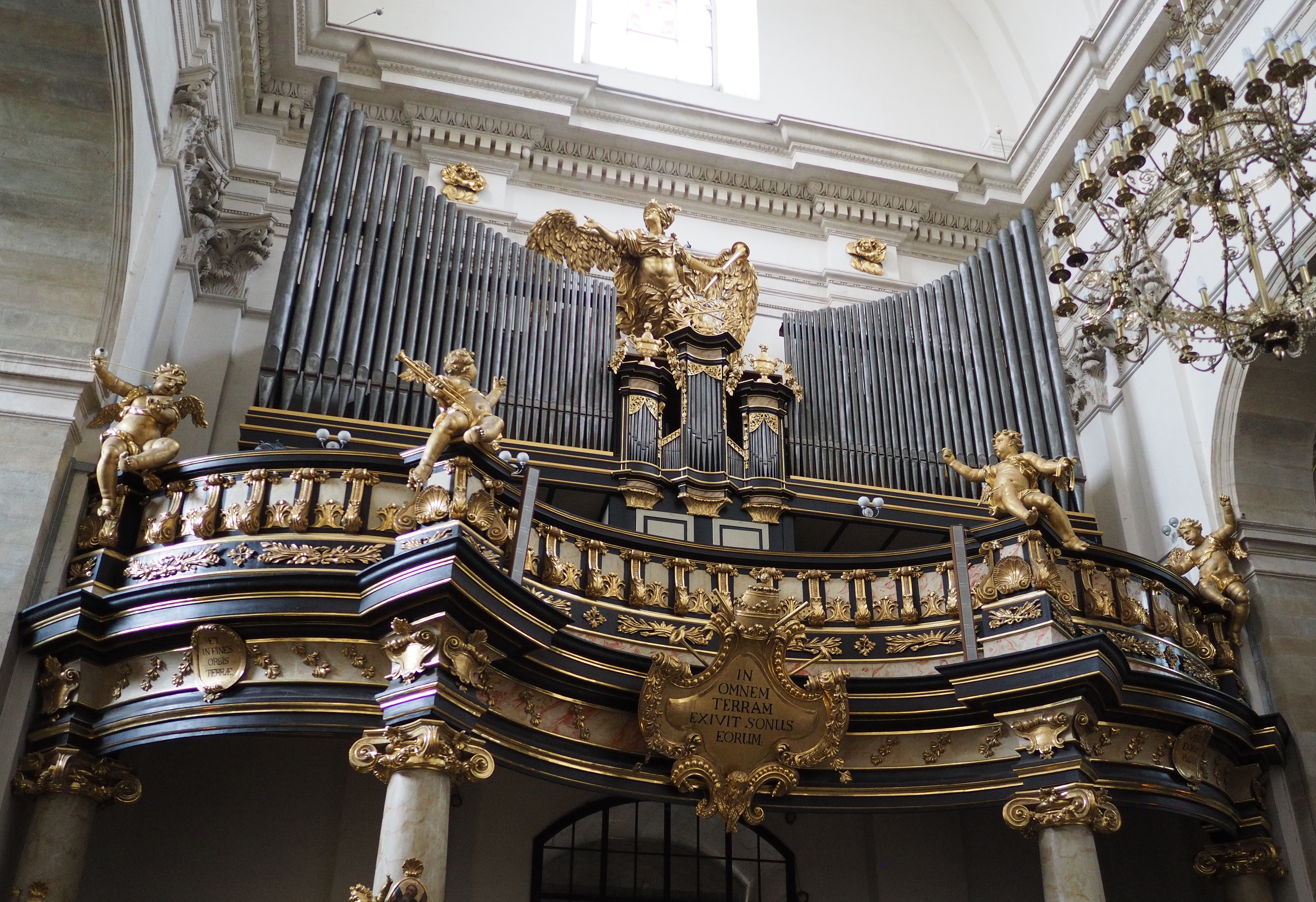
The organs

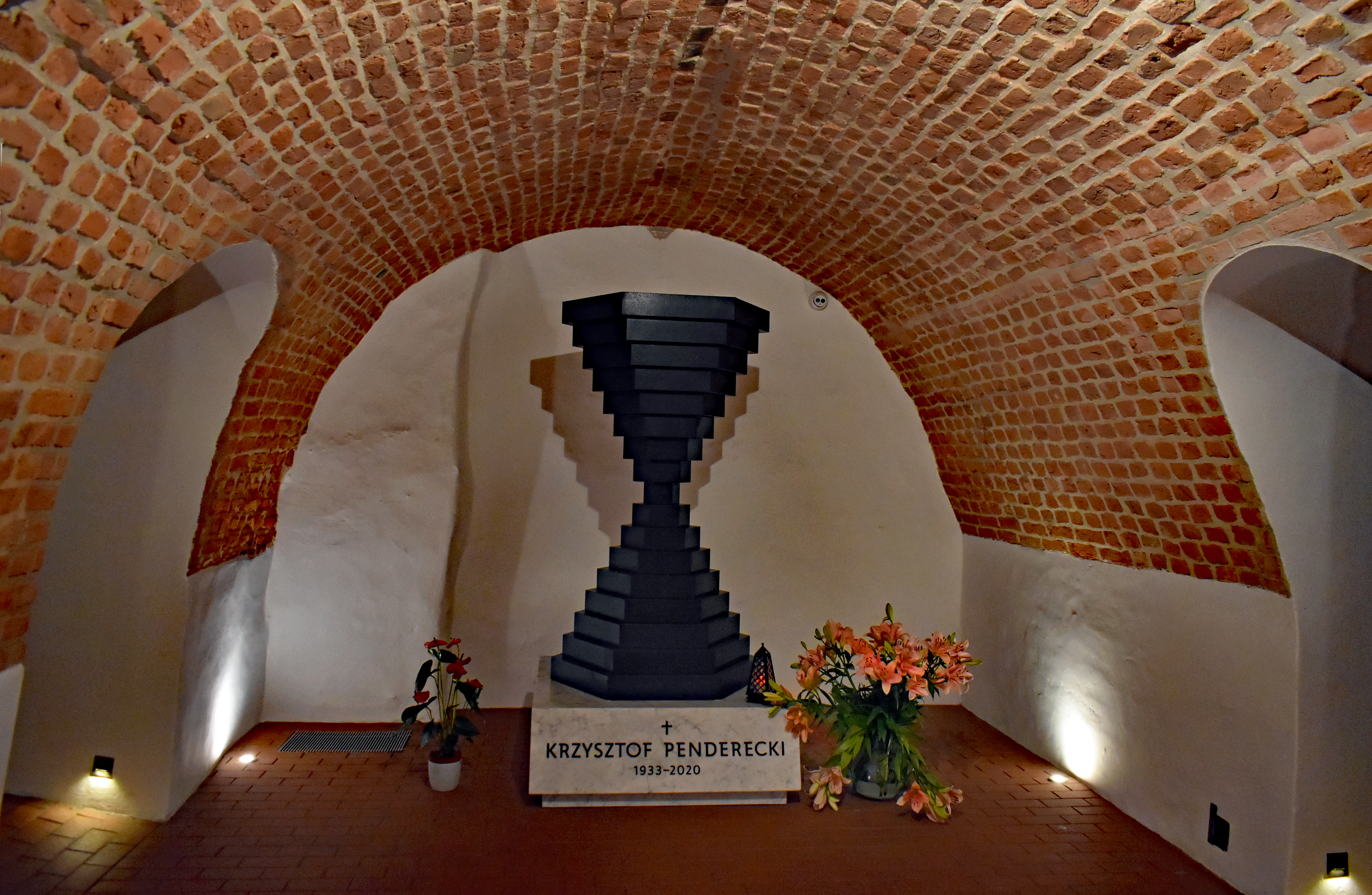
National Pantheon
The urn with Krzysztof Penderecki's ashes

== See also ==
- 17th-century Western domes
- Churches of Kraków
- List of Jesuit sites
