= Aleksander Polanowski =

Pobóg coat of arms

Alexander or Aleksander Polanowski entitled to use coat of arms Pobóg (died April 24, 1687) was colonel of the Royal Hussar (also known as the Winged Hussars), Royal Grand Master of the Pantry (Agriculture Secretary of the Crown) since 1678 and Royal Grand Standard Bearer since 1685. The Grand Standard Bearer of the Crown was the fourth in military commandership after the King, the "Hetman Wielki" (the military Commander in Chief) and the “Hetman Polny” (the Field Commander).

Alexander's military career began probably during the Cossack uprising of Bohdan Zynoviy Mykhailovych Khmelnytsky. In 1656 he participated in the war with the Swedes, fighting in the battles of Prostki and Filipów. In the years 1657–1659, together with Polish Hetman Stefan Czarniecki he was dispatched on Western Pomerania and Denmark. Probably commanded the Czarniecki's right wing divisions at the battle of Połonka, on June 27, 1660. He was also actively involved in Ukraine. He participated in the Battles of Lyubar and Słobodyszcze. In autumn 1663 under the leadership of Polish King John II Casimir Vasa took part in the expedition to Dniprovsky. Shortly, he defected to the field of Prince Jerzy or George Sebastian Lubomirski opposite to the last King Vasa. Later he returned to the rightful King's field and commanded troops in battle against Lubomirski’ rebels near Częstochowa.

After the end of Lubomirski's rebellion, Polanowski entered in the service of the Crown Hetman Jan or John Sobieski (future elected King John III Sobieski), who during the free election in 1669 was the major candidate for the Polish Crow and therefore ruler of “The Commonwealth” (the whole Realm – nowadays Poland, Lithuania, Belarus, Ukraine, Latvia, etc. ). He participated in the expedition to Hajec, commanding the left side of the Polish army. In the years 1671-1676 he fought against the Turkish and Tartars troops, participating in the expedition to Bratslav, and fighting the Tatars in Chocimska campaign. In August 1683 went to Vienna, but during the military taking exercise in Tarnów Mountains became ill and had to return to his homeland. Soon after, he resigned from the military, living with the profits of the salt mines of Kraków given to him by the King of Poland (Jan III Sobieski) for live.

== Sources ==
- This page is a roughly translation after its “tween page” from Polish Wikipedia - May 4, 2014 Aleksander Polanowski.
- Aleksander Polanowski w Polskim Słowniku Biograficznym. (Polish Biographical Dictionary, in Polish).
