= Broniszów, Podkarpackie Voivodeship =

Broniszów
- Village
- Location within Poland
- Coordinates: 49°59′21″N 21°35′2″E
- Country: Poland
- Voivodeship: Subcarpathian
- County: Ropczyce-Sędziszów
- Gmina: Wielopole Skrzyńskie
- Time zone: UTC+1 (CET)
  - Summer (DST): UTC+2 (CEST)
- Vehicle registration: RRS

Broniszów [brɔˈniʂuf] is a village in the administrative district of Gmina Wielopole Skrzyńskie, within Ropczyce-Sędziszów County, Subcarpathian Voivodeship, in south-eastern Poland.

Five Polish citizens were murdered by Nazi Germany in the village during World War II.

== Notable people ==
- Karol Olszewski (1846–1915), Polish chemist, mathematician, and physicist; first scientist in the world to liquify oxygen and nitrogen; born in the village (then Broniszów Tarnowski).
