= Władysław Pobóg-Malinowski =

Polish historian (1899–1962)

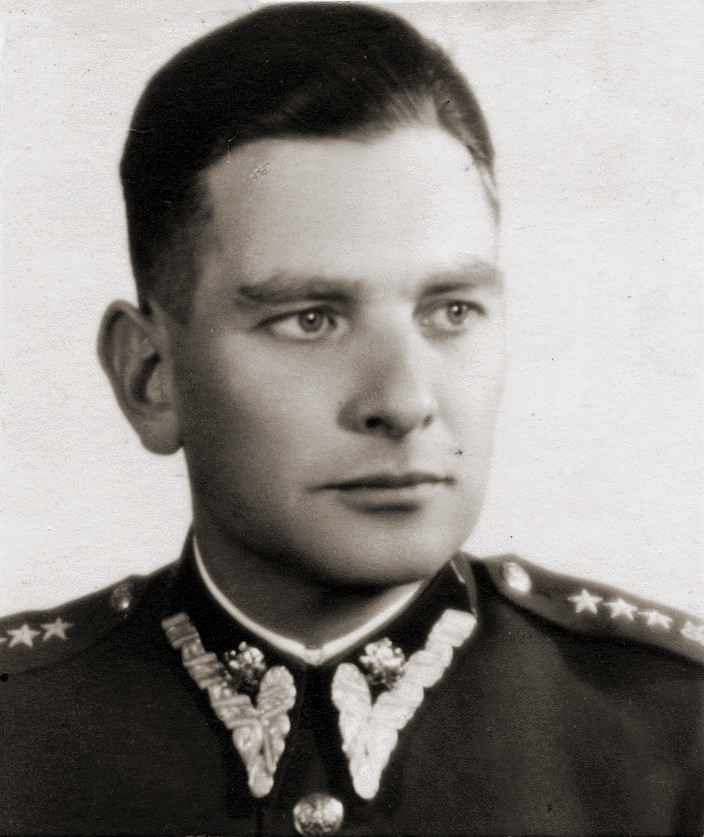
Władysław Pobóg-Malinowski

Władysław Pobóg-Malinowski (1899–1962) was a Polish soldier, historian and journalist. An officer of the Polish Army, he is best known as a historian and author of numerous books on modern history of Poland. His most notable work is the Modern Political History of Poland published in 1956 in London. Although blacklisted by the censorship in Communist-controlled Poland, the book was clandestinely published and re-edited in Poland several times.

Władysław Pobóg-Malinowski was born on 23 November 1899 in Arkhangelsk in Imperial Russia, to a family of szlachta descent (Pobóg being the name of his family's coat of arms, traditionally attached to one's surname in Poland). During the Great War he reached Poland and joined the Polish Army soon after it had been formed in 1918, following Poland's restoration of independence. He took part in the Polish-Bolshevist War of 1920. After the war he remained in the army and served in the 21st Field Artillery Regiment (Kraków, 1923), the headquarters of the Kraków-based 5th Corps District Command (1924) and the 12th Field Artillery Regiment (1928, Złoczów). During his military service he also graduated from the Jagiellonian University (faculties of Polish studies and political science).

In 1929 he was attached to the Warsaw-based Military Historical Bureau. Among the best-known works he co-authored and edited was a 10-volume edition of selected works of Józef Piłsudski, Poland's chief of state and military leader. Pobóg-Malinowski retired from the army in 1931 (officially discharged with honours on 1 October 1932) and started working at the Ministry of Foreign Affairs. Following the outbreak of World War II he settled in London. In 1944 he once again became a Polish diplomat and was posted to Paris. During his stay there he briefly headed the Polish-language section of the Radiodiffusion française.

After the war he remained in exile. He continued his work on books on modern history of Poland, from the partitions of Poland to the post-war period. Apart from the highly popular Political history of Poland, he also authored a monograph on Polish National Democrats in the period between 1887 and 1918, a monograph on the Bezdany raid, as well as started a monumental 6-volume biography of Józef Piłsudski (only two volumes were published). He died on 21 November 1962 in Geneva. After 1989 a yearly prize for "best historical debut work" was set up in his honour by the Polish Academy of Sciences and the Institute of National Remembrance.
