= Nawrocki (surname) =

Pobóg coat of arms, used by some of Nawrocki family

Nawrocki (Polish pronunciation: [naˈvrɔt͡ski]; feminine Nawrocka, plural Nawroccy) is a Polish-language surname. It likely originated from a place name, Nawra or Nawry, deriving from the verb nawracać, nawrócić, meaning "to turn, revert, convert," often referring to a change in religion or conversion. Some of them use Pobóg coat of arms or Lubicz coat of arms. It may be transliterated as: Nawrocky, Navrocky, Navrocki, Navrotski, Navrotsky, Nawrotsky, Nawrotzky, Nowrocki, Nowrocky. In 1990, there were 21,798 Poles by this name, living all over Poland. In 2011, the number of Poles with this name living in Poland had fallen to 19,830, and as of 2022 is 17,240.

== People ==
- Alexander Navrotsky (1839–1914), Russian poet and playwright
- Alexandra Navrotsky (born 1943), American physical chemist
- Barbara Nawrocka-Dońska (1924–2018), Polish writer
- Edyta Nawrocka, Polish singer
- Irena Nawrocka (1917–2009), Polish fencer
- Jacek Nawrocki (born 1965), Polish volleyball player and coach
- Jan Nawrocki (1913–2000), Polish fencer
- Janusz Nawrocki (born 1961), Polish footballer

Karol Nawrocki (born 1983), President of Poland

- Karol Nawrocki (born 1983), Polish historian and politician, President of Poland (since 2025)
- Maik Nawrocki (born 2001), Polish footballer
- Marta Nawrocka (born 1986), Polish civil servant, First Lady of Poland (since 2025)
- Mike Nawrocki (born 1966), American animator, filmmaker, teacher, and voice actor
- Mikołaj Nawrocki (2001), Polish footballer
- Norman Nawrocki, Canadian comedian, sex educator and musician
- Ryan Nawrocki (born 1983/1984), American politician
- Ryszard Nawrocki (1940–2011), Polish actor
- Sławomir Nawrocki (born 1969), Polish fencer
- William Nawrocki (born 1899), American politician
