= Karol Olszewski =

Polish chemist, mathematician, and physicist

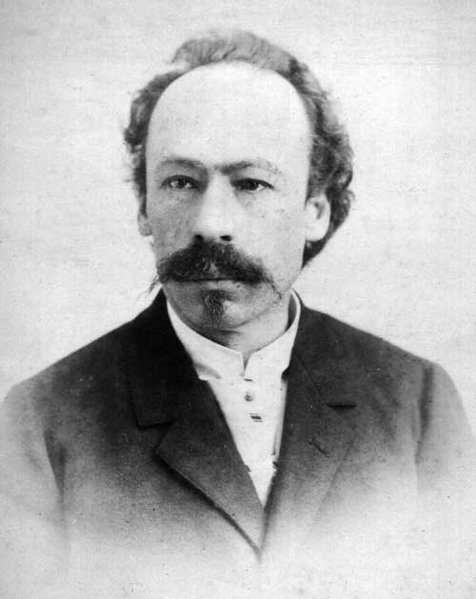
- Karol Olszewski
- Born: Karol Stanisław Olszewski; 29 January 1846; Broniszów, Austrian Galicia
- Died: 24 March 1915 (aged 69); Kraków, Austrian Galicia
- Education: Jagiellonian University in Kraków; Heidelberg University PhD
- Occupation: Scientist
- Known for: First to liquefy oxygen and nitrogen. First Polish X-ray Photographs
- Title: Professor

Karol Stanisław Olszewski (Polish pronunciation: [ˈkarɔl ɔlˈʂɛfskʲi]; 29 January 1846 – 24 March 1915) was a Polish chemist, mathematician, and physicist. Together with Zygmunt Wróblewski, in 1883 he was the first scientist in the world to liquefy oxygen and nitrogen.

== Life and career ==
He was born in 1846 in Broniszów. He was a graduate of Kazimierz Brodziński High School in Tarnów (I Liceum Ogólnokształcące im. Kazimierza Brodzińskiego). He studied at Kraków's Jagiellonian University in the departments of mathematics and physics, and chemistry and biology. He carried out his first experiments using a personally improved compressor, compressing and condensing carbon dioxide.

Olszewski defended his doctoral dissertation at Heidelberg University, then returned to Kraków, where he was made profesor nadzwyczajny (associate professor).

In 1883, Zygmunt Wróblewski and Karol Olszewski were the first in the world to liquefy oxygen, nitrogen and carbon dioxide from the atmosphere in a stable state (not, as had been the case up to then, in a dynamic state in the transitional form as vapor).

In 1884, in his Kraków laboratory, Olszewski was the first to liquefy hydrogen in a dynamic state, achieving a record low temperature of −225 °C (48 K). In 1895 he liquefied argon. He then failed only to liquefy the newly discovered helium element.

In January 1896, on hearing of Wilhelm Röntgen's work with X-rays, within a few days Olszewski replicated it. Later on, in early February he provided an X-ray image of a luxated elbow thus initiating the university's department of radiology.

He died on 24 March 1915 and was buried at the Rakowicki Cemetery in Kraków. In 2018, his ashes were transferred to one of Poland's National Pantheons located at the Church of Saints Peter and Paul in the Old Town district of Kraków.

According to physicist Andrzej Kajetan Wróblewski, Olszewski is among the greatest Polish physicists of the 20th century alongside Marie Curie, Marian Smoluchowski, Jerzy Pniewski, and Marian Danysz.

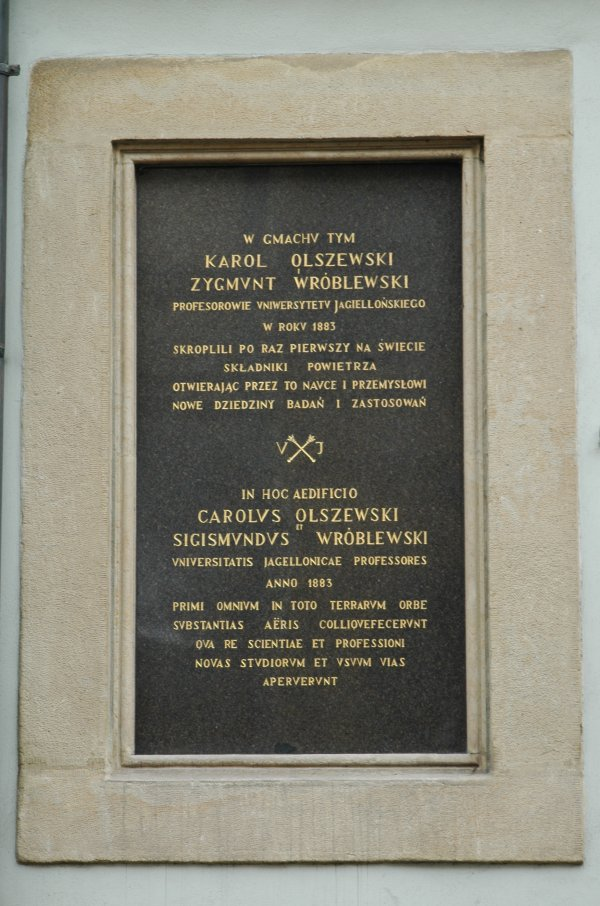
Inscription in Polish and Latin: "In this building Karol Olszewski [and] Zygmunt Wróblewski professors at Jagiellonian University in 1883 for the first time in the world liquifed components of air thereby opening to science and industry new fields of research and application"

== See also ==
- Timeline of low-temperature technology
- Timeline of hydrogen technologies
- List of Poles
