= Czarnowski =

Czarnowski (feminine: Czarnowska; plural: Czarnowscy) is a Polish surname. Notable people with the surname include:

- Hieronim Czarnowski (1834–1902), Polish chess player
- Jan Czarnowski (1883–1963), Polish nobleman
- Lucile Czarnowski (1895–1985), American dance historian, educator
- Ortwin Czarnowski (born 1940), German cyclist
- Patryk Czarnowski (born 1985), Polish volleyball player
- Stefan Czarnowski (1879–1937), Polish sociologist
