= Wojtowicz family =

Polish aristocratic family

Wojtowicz
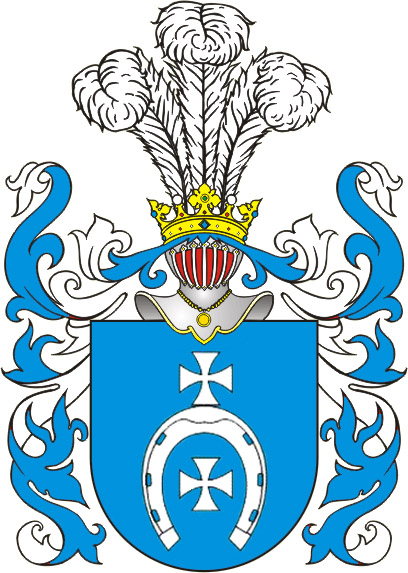
- Lubicz coat of arms
- Current region: Poland
- Earlier spellings: Woytowicz
- Origin: Wojtowice, Polish–Lithuanian Commonwealth (since 1945 Ukraine)-Ruthenian

The House of Wojtowicz from Volhynia (plural form: Wojtowiczowie) was a part of the nobility of Poland (the family's roots were probably in the Lithuanian-Ruthenian nobility). The village of Wojtowice of Ostróg County in Volhynia is the origin of this house.

Wojtowicz family is sealed with the Lubicz coat of arms.

== History ==
First note about the family comes from 1427 - the son of the knight Wojciech (Wojto vel. Woyto) is written as Wojtowicz. The house was mentioned in 1576 as the Volhynian nobility (while taking part in the coronation parliament of the Polish king, Stephen Báthory). Jan Wojtowicz of Lubicz coat of arms, son of Stefan and Franciszka Załuska, grandson of Stanisław and Teresa Byczkowska, great-grandson of Marcin, proved his nobility in the Łuck County in the territory of Russian partition of Poland in 1803. The Wojtowicz family possessed villages in Volhynia, Podolia, voivodeships: Kiev (Pavoloch), Ruthenian (Wojtowszczyzna, Nienaszow, Draganowa) and Sandomierz (Ulow).

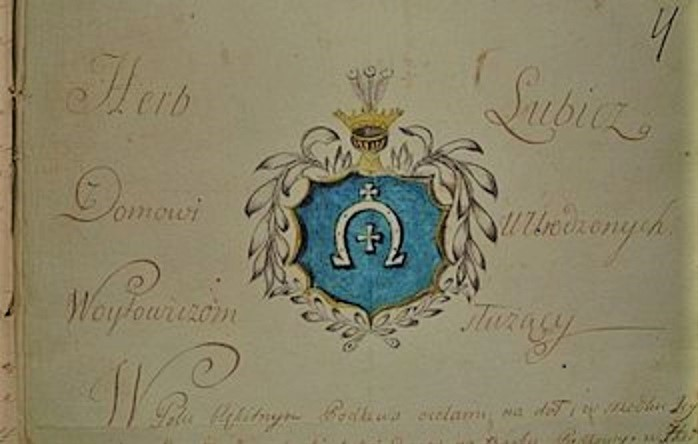
"Lubicz coat of arms serves the House of Wojtowicz" - the proof of nobility in 1803

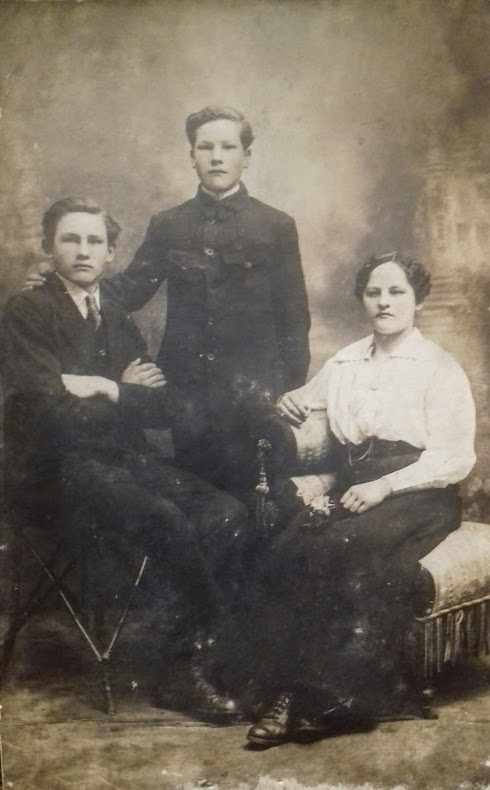
Young generation of the Wojtowicz family - 1920

== Known members of the family ==
- Jan Wojtowicz of Pavoloch (17th c.) - the owner of Pavoloch, a knight in the army of Prince Władysław Dominik Zasławski-Ostrogski;
- Marcin Wojtowicz - the hussar in the Crown Army of Felix Kazimierz Potocki at the Battle of Podhajce (1698);
- Stanisław Wojtowicz - the court's writer of Łuck County in 1743–1746, the deputy judge (subiudex) of Łuck County in 1747–1748;
- Karol de Lubicz Woytowicz "Chmielewski" (1839–1866) - the insurrectionist in the Polish January Uprising (1863–1864);
- Józef Wojtowicz (1864–1925) - a landowner, the owner of Ulów;
