= Kromer =

Kromer or Krömer is a surname. Notable people with the surname include:

== People ==
- Aaron Kromer, American football coach
- George "Stormy" Kromer (1876–1970), semiprofessional baseball player
- Kurt Krömer (born 1974), German television presenter, comedian and actor
- Leon Kromer, American soldier and football coach
- Marcin Kromer (German: Martin Cromer; 1512–1589), Prince-Bishop of Warmia (Ermland), cartographer
  - House of Kromer
- Tom Kromer (1906–1969), American writer

== Fictional characters ==
- A character from the 1919 novel Demian
- A boss enemy in Limbus Company

== See also ==
- Cramer (disambiguation)
- Cromer
- Kramer (disambiguation)
- Franz Krommer
- Danish krone
