= Wróblewski (Lubicz) =

- Lubicz coat of arms
- Current region: Poland
- Origin: Polish–Lithuanian Commonwealth

Wróblewski is one of the notable Polish noble families in the Kingdom of Poland.

== History ==
The origin of the Wróblewski family was in Polish–Lithuanian Commonwealth. There's no confirmation which Wróblewski got the Lubicz coat of arms first, but the oldest known member of the family was Wincenty Kazimierz Wróblewski. He lived in the eighteenth century and fought in the Kościuszko Uprising together with son, Antoni Józef Wróblewski, and was an acquittance of Tadeusz Kościuszko.

== Notable members ==
- Wincenty Wróblewski (1831-1892)
  - Stanisław Wróblewski (1868-1938)
  - Władysław Wróblewski (1875-1951)
