= Zygmunt Florenty Wróblewski =

Polish scientist

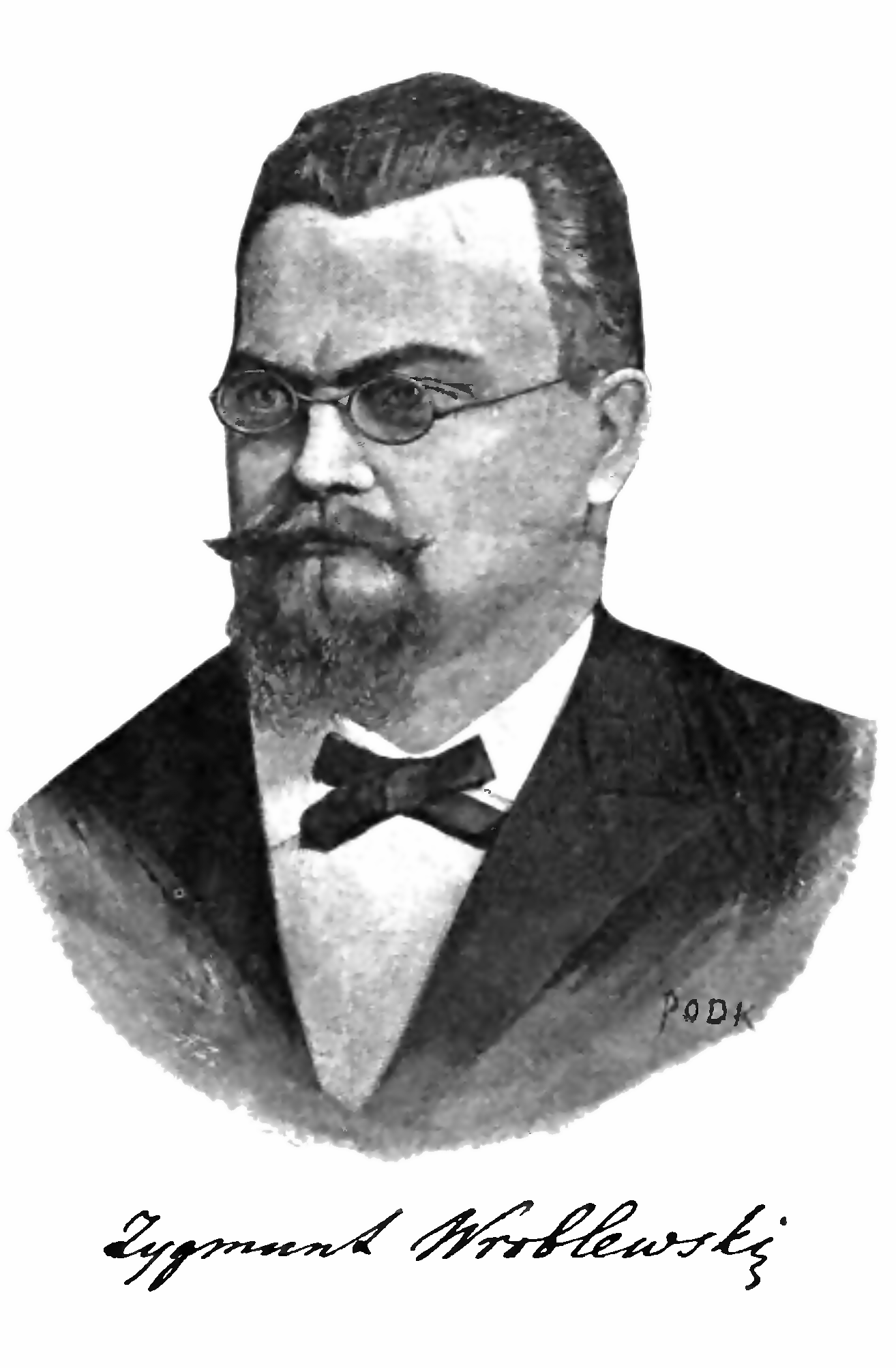
- Zygmunt Florenty Wróblewski
- Born: 28 October 1845; Grodno, Russian Empire
- Died: 16 April 1888 (aged 42); Kraków, Austria-Hungary
- Education: Kiev University; Ludwig-Maximilians-Universität München
- Known for: Liquid nitrogen
- Scientific career
- Fields: Chemistry; Physics

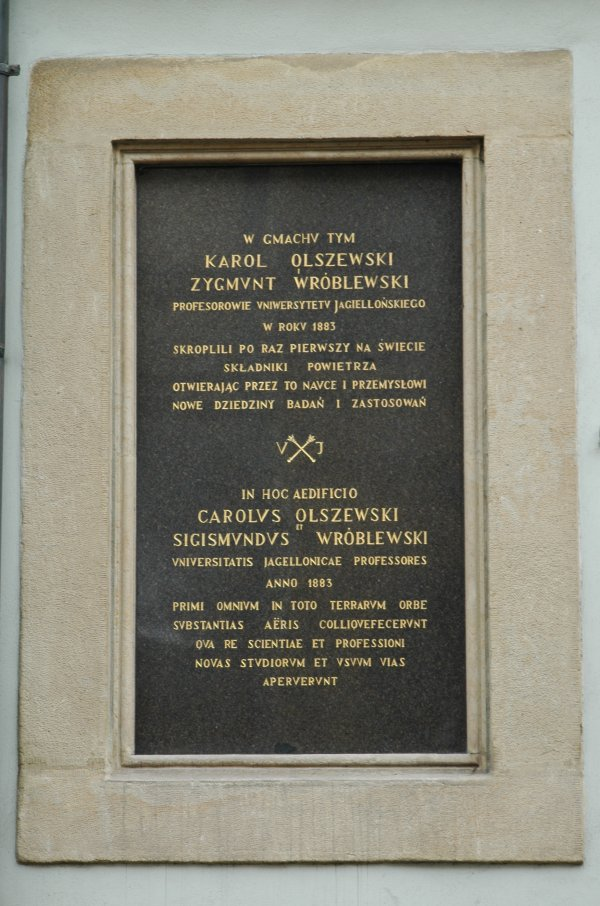
Inscription in Polish and Latin: "In this building Karol Olszewski and Zygmunt Wróblewski professors at Jagiellonian University in 1883 for the first time in the world liquefied components of air thereby opening to science and industry new fields of research and application"

Zygmunt Florenty Wróblewski (Polish pronunciation: [zɨɡˈmunt vrubˈlɛfskʲi]; 28 October 1845 – 16 April 1888) was a Polish physicist and chemist. Together with Karol Olszewski, he was the first scientist in the world to liquefy nitrogen in 1883.

== Biography ==
Wróblewski was born in Grodno (Russian Empire, now in Belarus). He studied at Kiev University. After a six-year exile for participating in the January 1863 Uprising against Imperial Russia, he studied in Berlin and Heidelberg. He defended his doctoral dissertation at the Ludwig-Maximilians-Universität München in 1876 and became an assistant professor at Strasburg University. In 1880, he became a member of the Polish Academy of Learning.

Wróblewski was introduced to gas condensation in Paris by Professor Caillet at the École Normale Supérieure. When Wróblewski was offered a chair in physics at Jagiellonian University, he accepted it. At Kraków he began studying gases and soon established a collaboration with Karol Olszewski.

While studying carbonic acid, Wróblewski discovered the CO_{2} hydrate. He reported this finding in 1882.

On 29 March 1883 Wróblewski and Olszewski used a new method of condensing oxygen, and on 13 April the same year—nitrogen.

Karol Olszewski continued the experiments, using an improved Pictet cascade apparatus, and carbon dioxide, boiling ethylene in vacuum, and boiling nitrogen and boiling air as cooling agents.

He died on 16 April 1888. While studying the physical properties of hydrogen, Wróblewski upset a kerosene lamp and was severely burned. He died soon after at a Kraków hospital and was buried at the Rakowicki Cemetery in Kraków.

In 1976, the International Astronomical Union (IAU) passed a decision to give the name of Wróblewski to one of the craters of the Moon in honour of the chemist.

== Books ==
- Ueber die Diffusion der Gase durch absorbirende Substanzen (On the Diffusion of Gases through Absorbing Substances, 1874)

== See also ==
- House of Wróblewski (Lubicz)
- Timeline of low-temperature technology
- Timeline of hydrogen technologies
- List of Poles
