= Lucile Czarnowski =

American educator

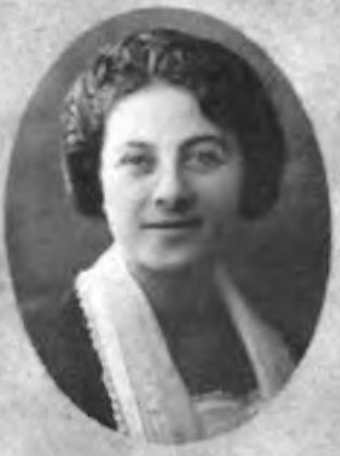
- Lucile K. Czarnowski, from the 1923 yearbook of the University of California
- Born: February 18, 1895; Arizona
- Died: October 7, 1985 (age 89); Greenbrae, California, U.S.
- Occupation(s): Educator, dance scholar

Lucile Katheryn Czarnowski (February 18, 1895 – October 7, 1985) was an American dance educator and scholar. She was founder and president of the Folk Dance Federation of California, and a professor at the University of California, Berkeley.

== Early life and education ==
Czarnowski was raised in Congress, Arizona, the daughter of Frank M. Czarnowski and Charlotte P. Mehl Czarnowski. Her father was born in Poland, and her mother was born in Missouri. She graduated from the University of California in 1923, and earned a master's degree from the University of Wisconsin in 1931, with a thesis titled "Some Genetic Phases of the Dance." She pursued further studies in dance at the Wigman School in Dresden, and at the Bennington School of Dance in Vermont.

== Career ==
Czarnowski taught physical education at the University of California, Berkeley, from 1923 to 1973. She read a paper on dance education at the World Congress of Physical Education in 1939, in Stockholm, and received an award from the King of Sweden for her work.

She was a founder and, from 1945 to 1946, the fourth president of the Folk Dance Federation of California. She was national dance chair of the American Association of Health, Physical Education, and Recreation. She was general director of the first California Folk Dance Festival, held in Ojai in 1946, She taught at the first several Idyllwild Folk Dance Workshops, in 1953, 1954 and 1955, and at the Stockton Folk Dance Camp. In 1968, she received the Heritage Award from the American Association of Health, Physical Education, and Recreation, for her lifetime achievements in the field.

== Publications ==
- "Summary of National Dance Section Meetings" (1940)
- Folk Dances from Near and Far (1945, multiple volumes)
- Dances of Early California Days (1950)
- How to Teach Folk and Square Dance (1953, rev. 1961, with Jack McKay)
- Folk Dance Teaching Cues (1963)
- "What is Right with the Dance" (1968)
- "Destined from the Start for her Life Work: Elizabeth Burchenal, 1877–1959" (1970)

== Personal life ==
Czarnowski died in 1985, in Greenbrae, California, at the age of 89.
