= Ujazd, Świętokrzyskie Voivodeship =

Ujazd
- Village
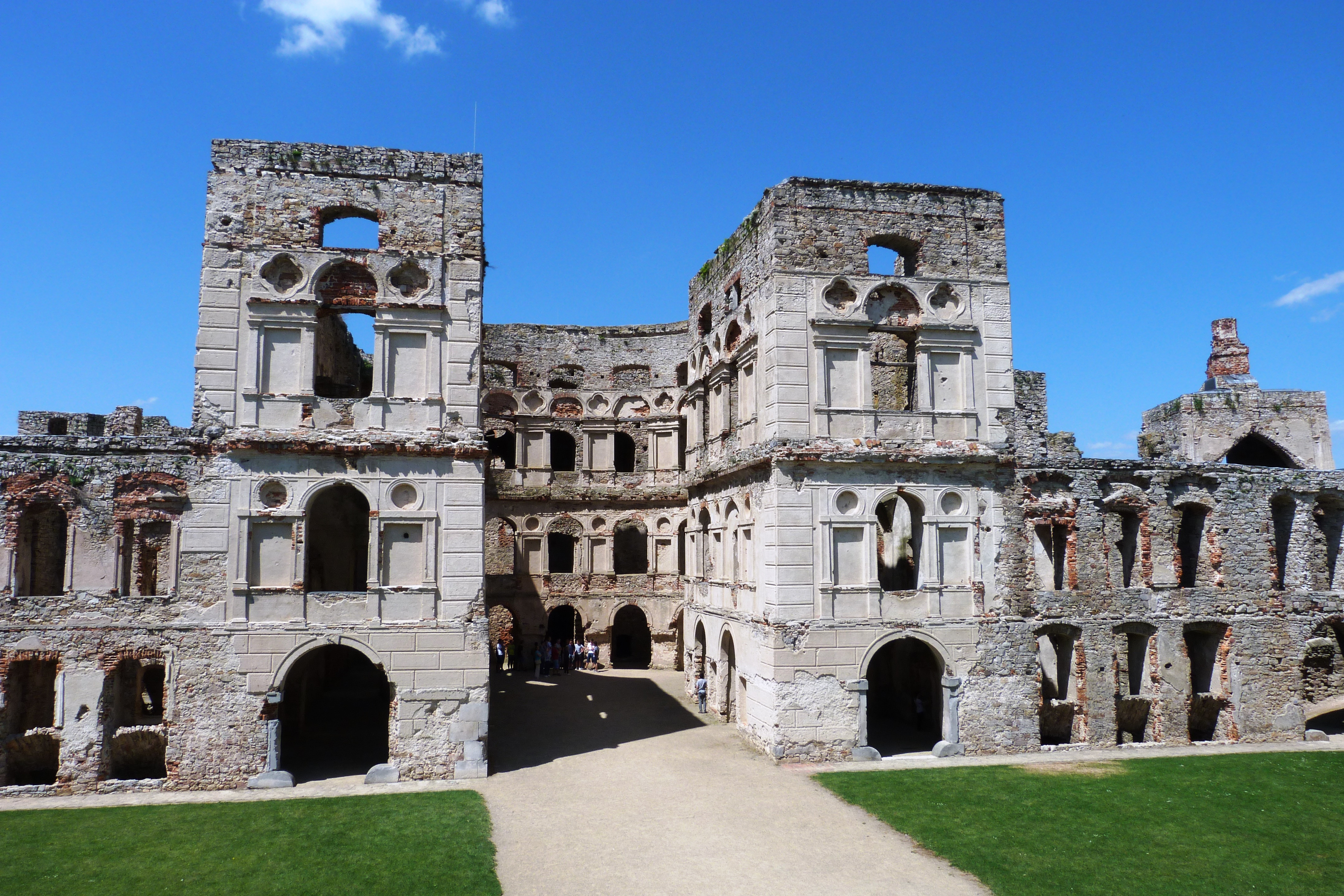
- Krzyżtopór castle

- Location within Poland
- Coordinates: 50°42′45″N 21°18′33″E
- Country: Poland
- Voivodeship: Świętokrzyskie
- County: Opatów
- Gmina: Iwaniska
- Population: 530
- Time zone: UTC+1 (CET)
  - Summer (DST): UTC+2 (CEST)
- Vehicle registration: TOP
- Website: krzyztopor.webpark.pl

Ujazd [ˈujast] is a village in the administrative district of Gmina Iwaniska, within Opatów County, Świętokrzyskie Voivodeship, in south-central Poland. It lies approximately 4 km (2 mi) south-east of Iwaniska, 14 km (9 mi) south-west of Opatów, and 53 km (33 mi) east of the regional capital Kielce.

The village is the location of the ruined castle of Krzyżtopór.

== History ==
Ujazd dates back to medieval Piast-ruled Poland. It was first mentioned in the act of endowment of the monastery in Jędrzejów in 1174–1176, and then also in the renewal of the monastery's privileges in 1210. Ujazd was a private village of Polish nobility, including the Oleśnicki, Zborowski, Ossoliński, Kalinowski, Wiśniowiecki, Morsztyn, Pac, Sołtyk, Łempicki and Orsetti families, administratively located in the Sandomierz County in the Sandomierz Voivodeship in the Lesser Poland Province. Krzysztof Ossoliński erected the Krzyżtopór castle. The castle was the site of Polish defenses against the Swedes in 1655 (Deluge) and the Russians in 1770 (Bar Confederation), suffering destruction as a result.

In 1827, Ujazd had a population of 143.
