= Maksymilian Ossoliński =

Polish–Lithuanian nobleman (c. 1558 – 1655)

Maksymilian Ossoliński (c. 1558 – 1655) was a Polish–Lithuanian nobleman and politician. He was chamberlain of Sandomierz (1633), treasurer of the Crown Court (1636–1648), castellan of Czersk (1648), and starost of Biecz and Malbork.

== Biography ==
Born in 1588 into the Ossoliński family of nobles, he was the third son of Jana Zbigniew (1555–1623) (MP, Speaker of the Sejm (1601)) and Matką Maksymiliana. His brothers were Krzysztof Ossoliński (1587–1645) (voivode of Sandomierz) and Jerzy Ossoliński (1595–1650) ( Treasurer, governor, Chancellor of the Crown). He studied with his brother Jerzy with the Jesuits in Lublin in 1596, and then at universities in Western Europe. He visited Italy and the Netherlands. Upon his return to Poland in 1607 he was courtier to Marcin Szyszkowski, and later was a royal courtier.

In 1618, he began his long career as a deputy of the province of Sandomierz. His military career saw him participate in the Battle of Chocim, where he led his own division. In the years 1626-1629, alongside his elder brother Krzysztof, he took part in the campaign against the Swedes in Prussia. He participated in the expedition against Russia's invasion of Smolensk (the Smolensk War). In 1633 his elder brother assumed the office of chamberlain of Sandomierz and in 1636, his brother Jerzy assumed the office of Treasurer of the Court.

== Personal life ==
After his father died in 1633, and after the death of his brother Jerzy in 1650, he inherited some of the family estates in places such as Ossolin, Klimontów, Krzelów, Zgórsko, Mielec, Sadowice and Przyłęk. He also continued his fathers work in the expensive construction of the Dominican monastery in Klimontów. In 1611 he married Helena Kazanowską (deceased before 1636), and about the year 1643 he married Katarzyną Głębocką.

With his first wife had these children, such as:

- Jan Ossoliński (1612–1682) - Commander of Malta in Poznań,
- Stanisław Ossoliński (1615–1643) - canon of Kraków,
- Zbigniew Ossoliński (zm.1675 r.) - Abbot of Kopřivnice,
- Władysław Krzysztof Ossoliński (zm.1696 r.) - Canon of Krakow and Płock,
- Hieronim Ossoliński (1616–1651) royal courtier, killed at the Battle of Beresteczko
- Jerzy Ossoliński (zm.1651) - mayor of Lublin (1650), also killed at the Battle of Beresteczko

He died in late 1654, well into his nineties, and was buried on 28 January 1655 in the basement of the Dominican convent of Klimontów .

== Bibliography ==
- S.K.Kossakowski;Monografie historyczno-genelogiczne niektórych rodzin polskich. Warszawa 1862, t.2.
- Dworaczek. Genealogia, tablica t. 144
- T. Żychliński; Herbarz 23
