= Ossoliński =

Polish aristocratic family

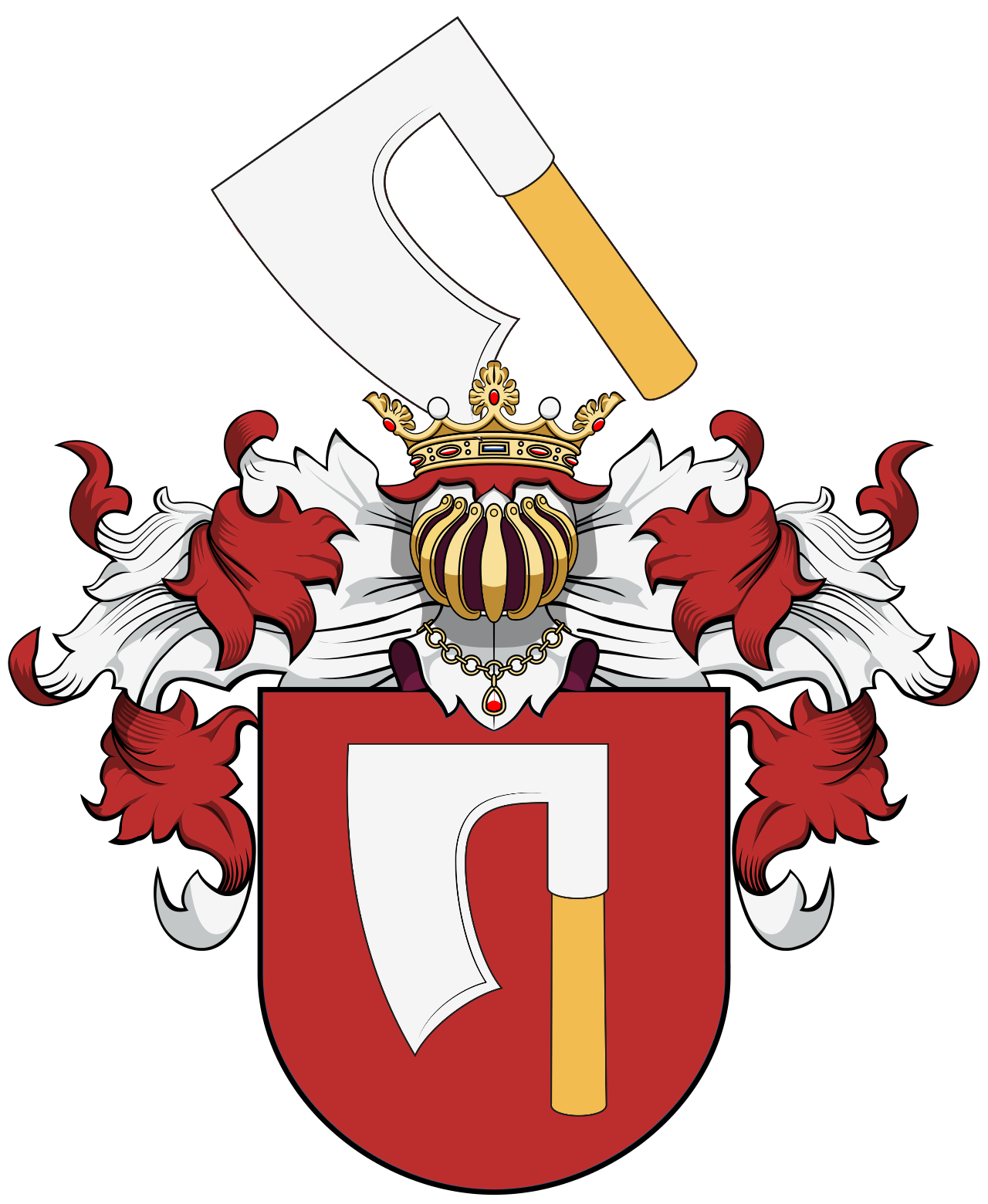
The family coat of arms is Topór.

The House of Ossoliński (plural: Ossolińscy) is a Polish aristocratic family from the Lesser Poland region. Because Polish adjectives have different forms for the genders, Ossolińska is the form for a female family member.

== History ==
The Ossolińskis are a prominent noble and magnate family. They appeared in the historical annals at the beginning of the 14th century. The progenitor of the family was Jan of Ossolin, son of Great Marshal of the Crown and castellan of Kraków Nawoj of Tęczyn. Jan was the main heir of the property that Nawoj left after his death. Due to the tradition in medieval Poland, he started to use the surname derived from the main family seat, the Ossolin Castle in Ossolin, Świętokrzyskie Voivodeship.

Grand Chancellor of the Crown Jerzy Ossoliński was granted a hereditary princely title by Pope Urban VIII in 1633. He also received a similar title, Reichsfürst, from the Emperor Ferdinand II in 1634. Another title was granted to Jerzy's cousin Franciszek Maksymilian Ossoliński by Louis XV, King of France, in 1736. The princely title became extinct in 1790, while the comital title lived on. Józef Maksymilian Ossoliński's famous library assembled in Vienna was transferred to Lwów, where he had located the Ossoliński Institute in 1817.

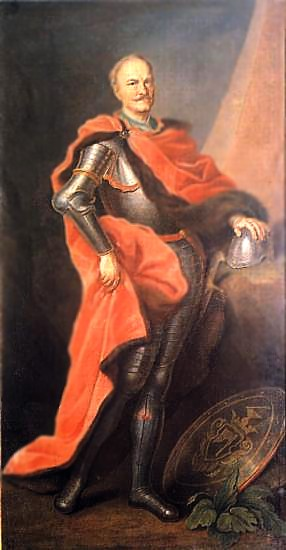
Franciszek Maksymilian Ossoliński

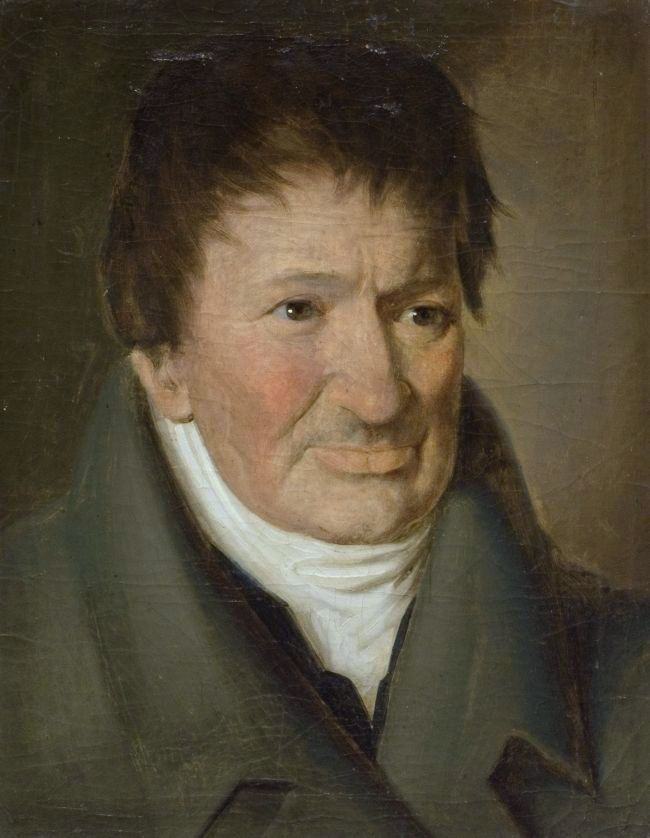
Józef Maksymilian Ossoliński

Princely House of Ossoliński (1633)

Counts Ossoliński (1785)

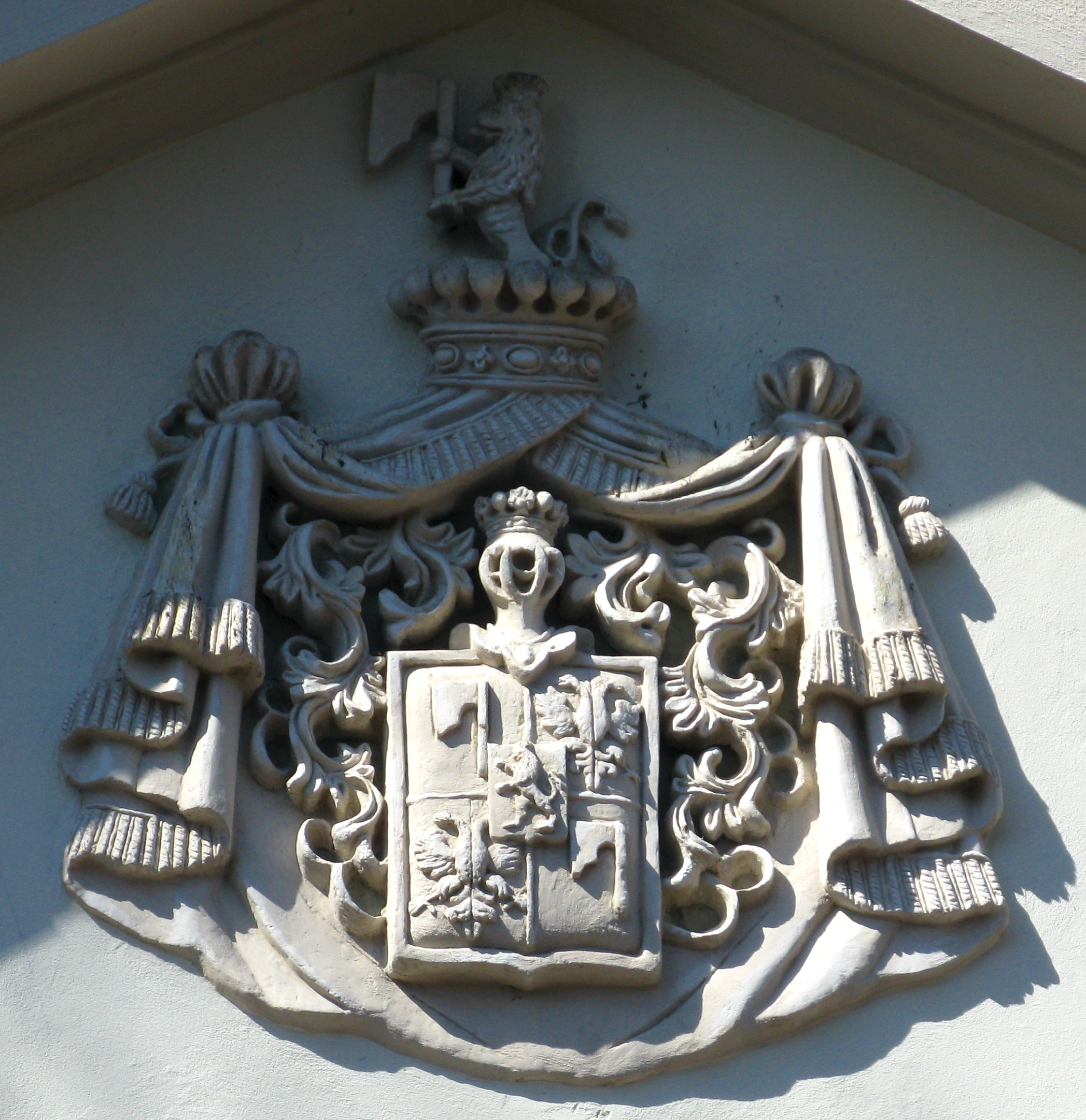
Coat of Arms of the Ossoliński family on the Church of St. Anthony of Padua, in Warsaw

== Members ==
- Jan Zbigniew Ossoliński (1555-1628), Podkomorzy, voivode
- Maksymilian Ossoliński (c. 1558 -1655), Polish-Lithuanian nobleman and politician. He was Chamberlain of Sandomierz (1633), Treasurer of the Crown Court (1636-1648), Castellan of Czersk (1648) and Starost of Biecz and Malbork.
- Krzysztof Ossoliński (1587-1645) Podkomorzy, Podstoli, voivode
- Jerzy Ossoliński (1595-1650), Great Crown Chancellor
- Helena Tekla Ossolińska (?-1687), was married to Aleksander Michał Lubomirski
- Franciszek Maksymilian Ossoliński (1676-1756) Grand Chancellor
- Anna Teresa Ossolińska (?-1810), was married to Stanisław Potocki
- Józef Maksymilian Ossoliński (1748–1826), founder of the Ossoliński Institute
- Józef Kajetan Ossoliński (1758-1834), castellan, senator
- Wiktor Maksymilian Ossoliński (1790-1860), castellan
- Aleksander Józef Ossoliński (1824-1903), castellan

== Palaces ==
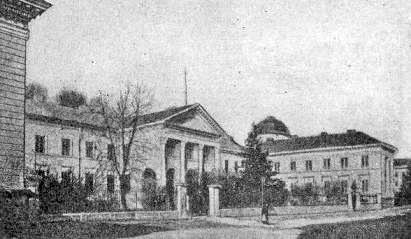
The Ossoliński Institute in Lwów

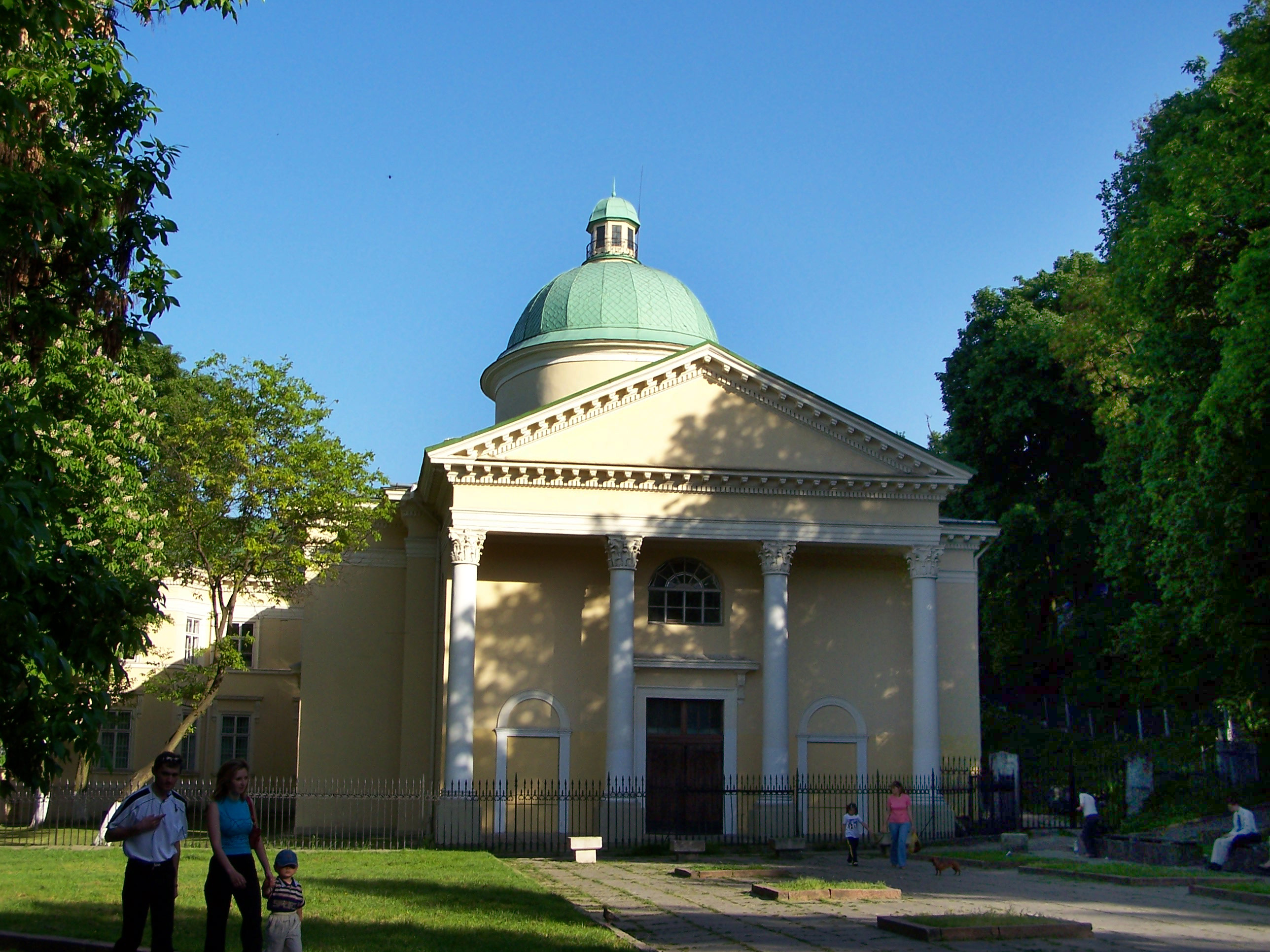
The Ossoliński Institute in Lwów

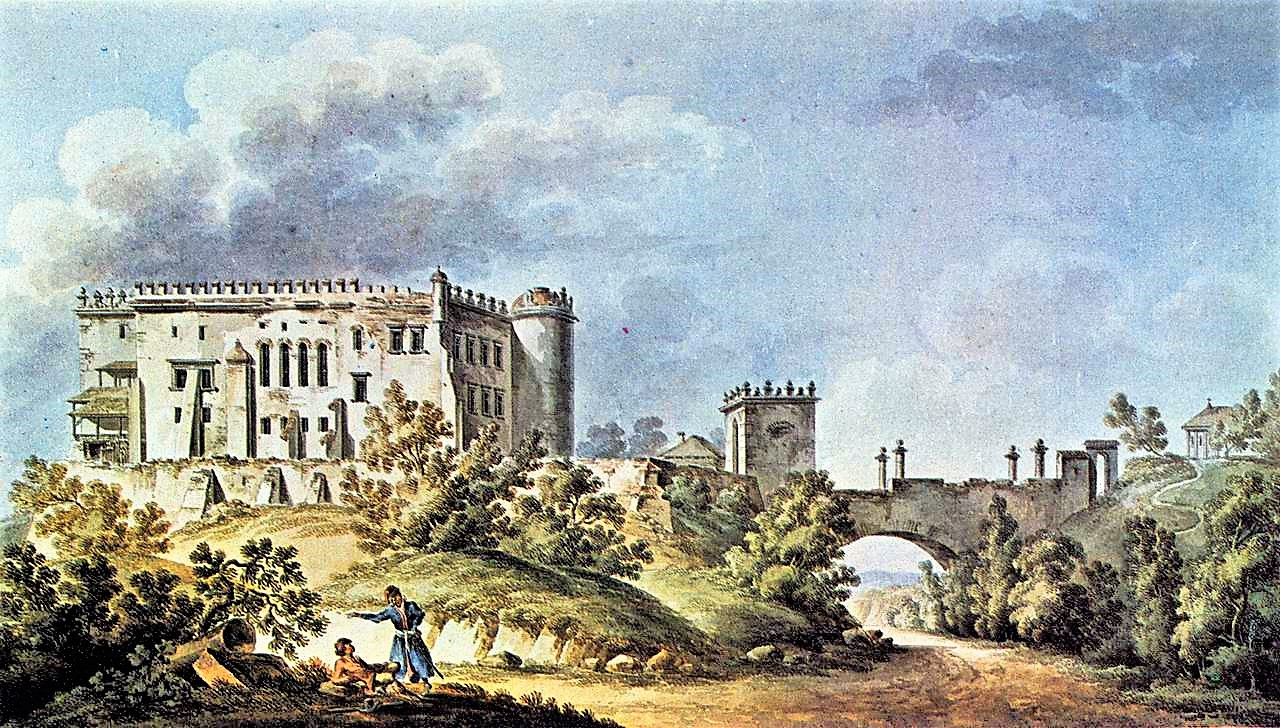
Ossolin Castle, Ossolin, 1794

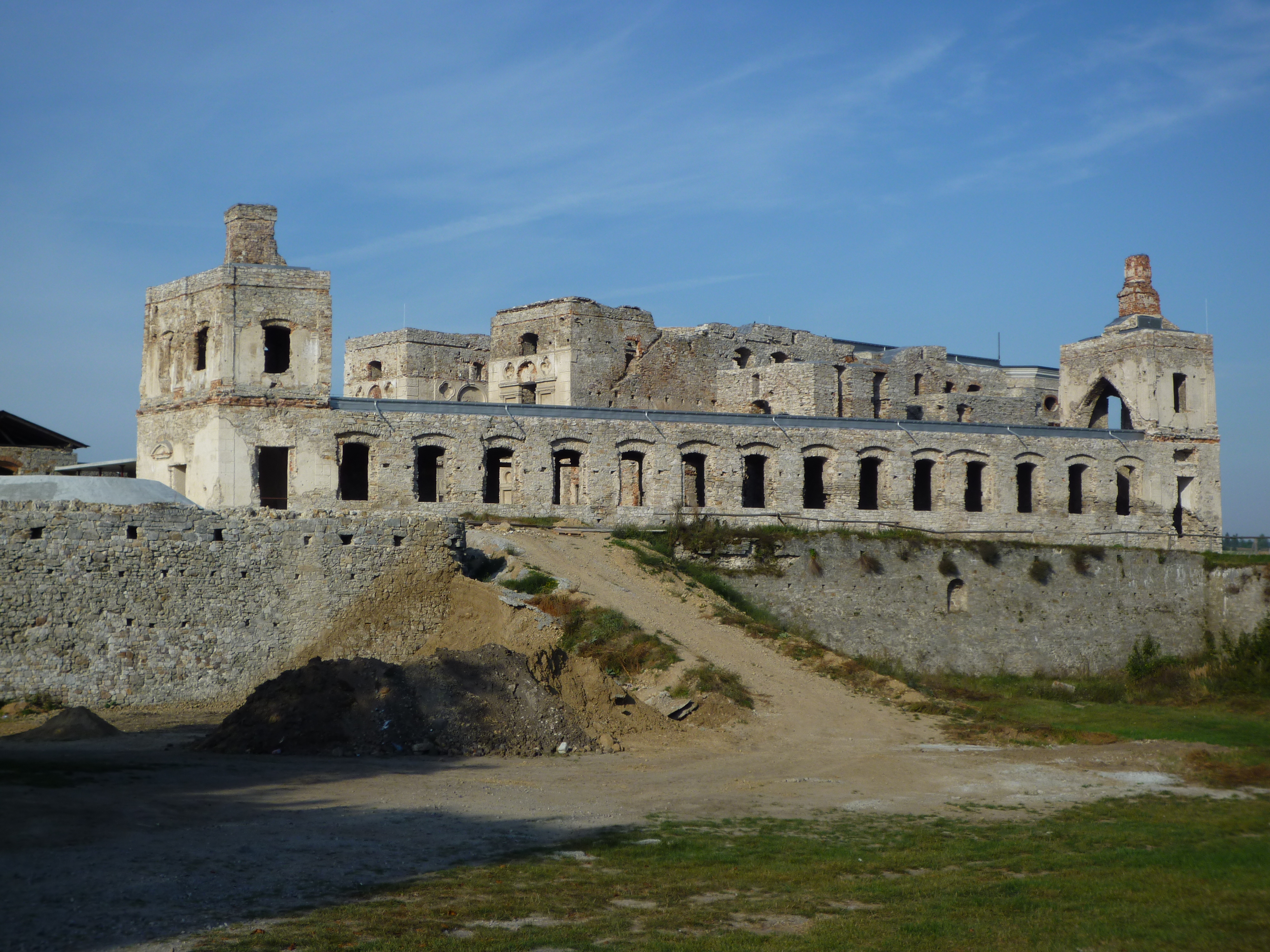
Castle in Krzyżtopór

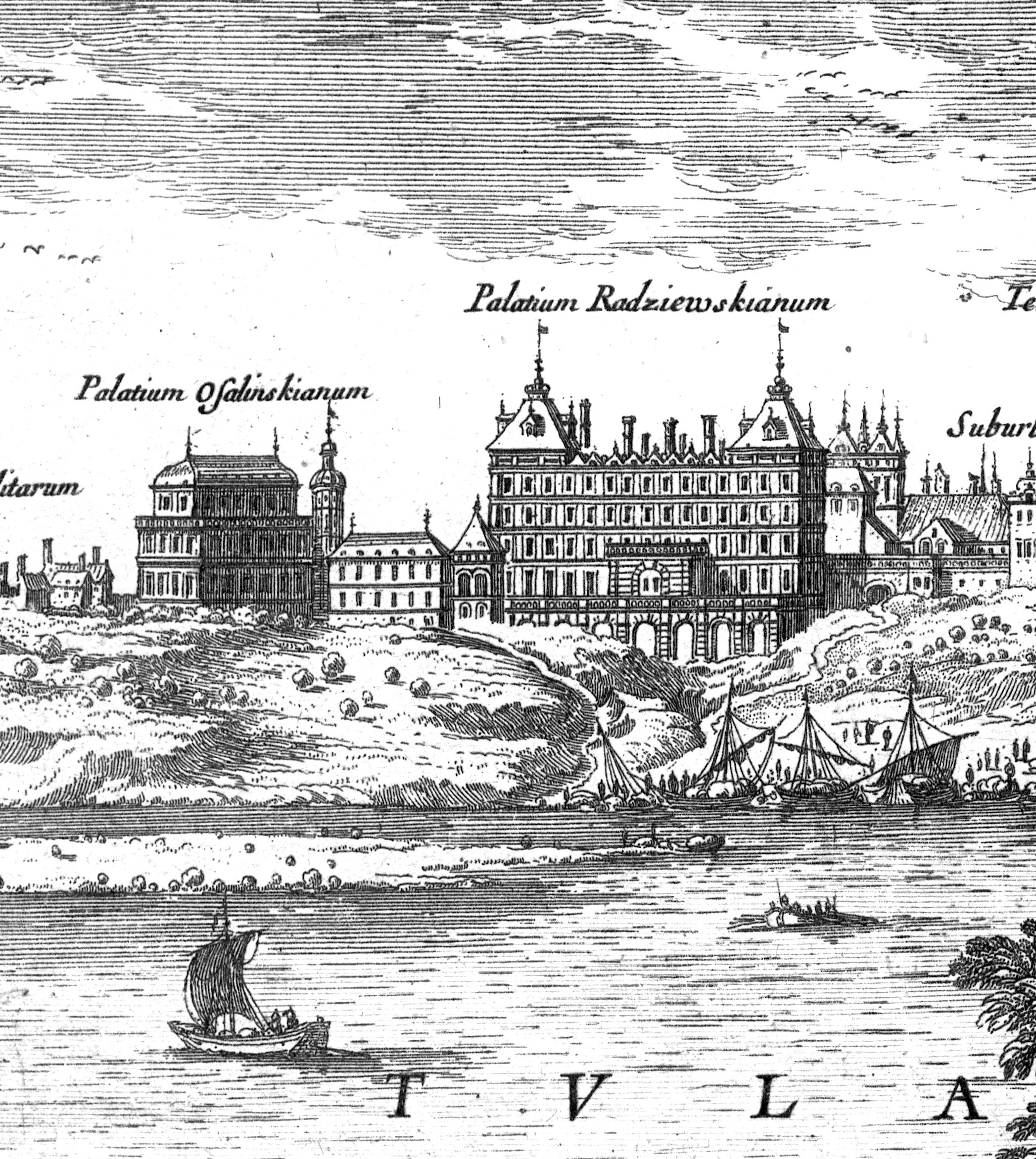
Palace of Jerzy Ossoliński in Warsaw (on the left)

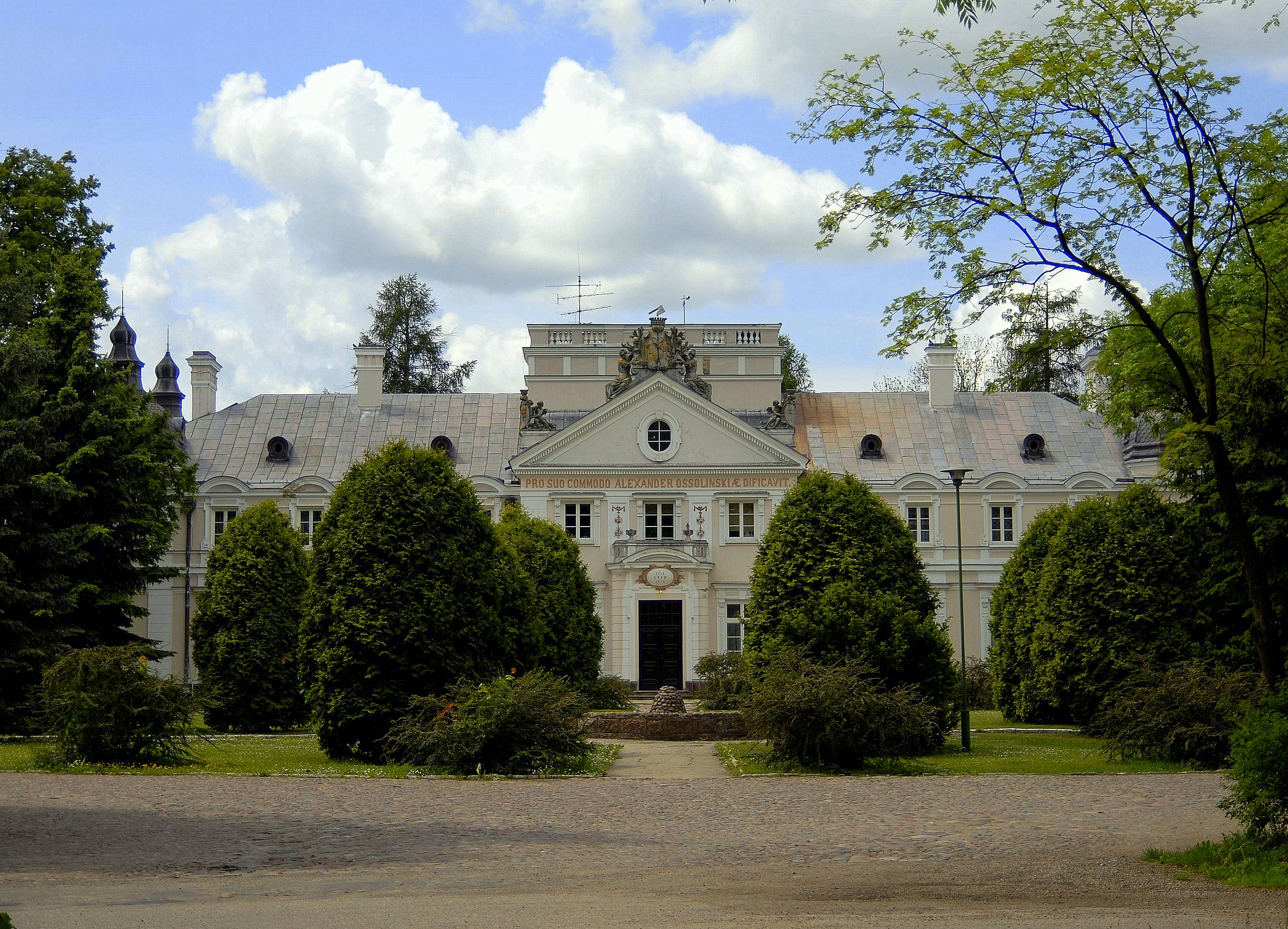
Ossoliński Palace in w Rudka

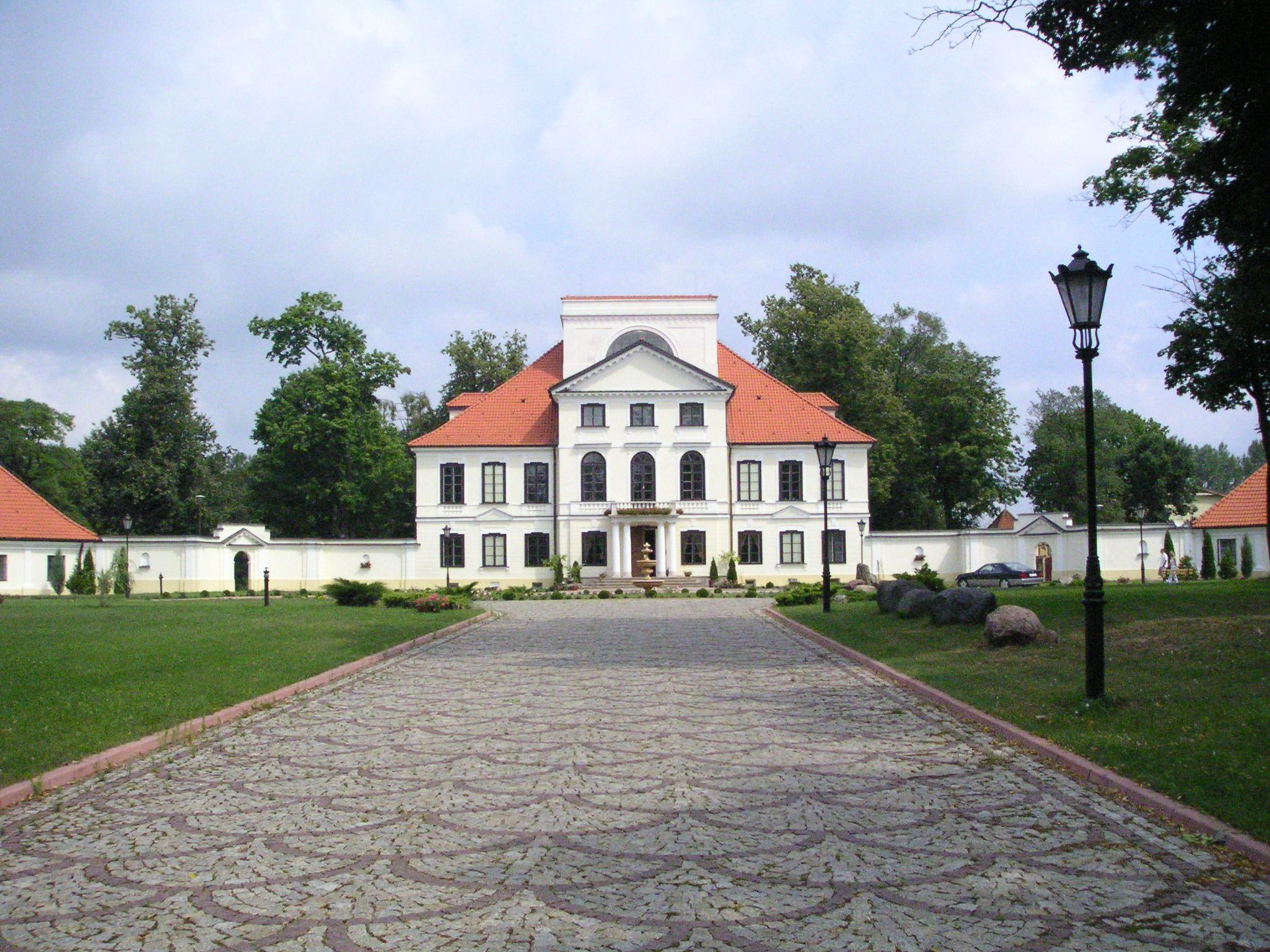
Palace in Sterdyń

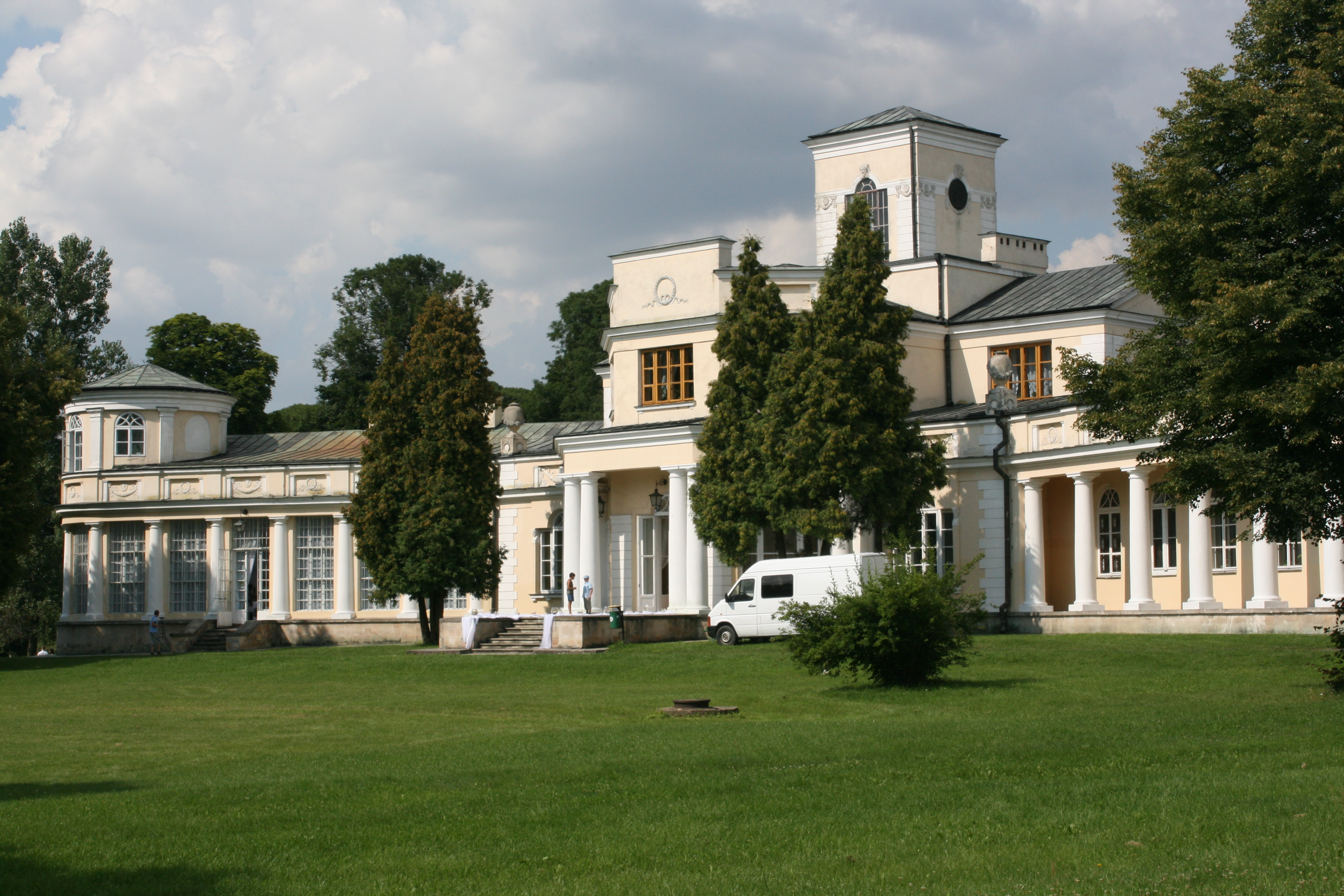
Palace in Rejowiec

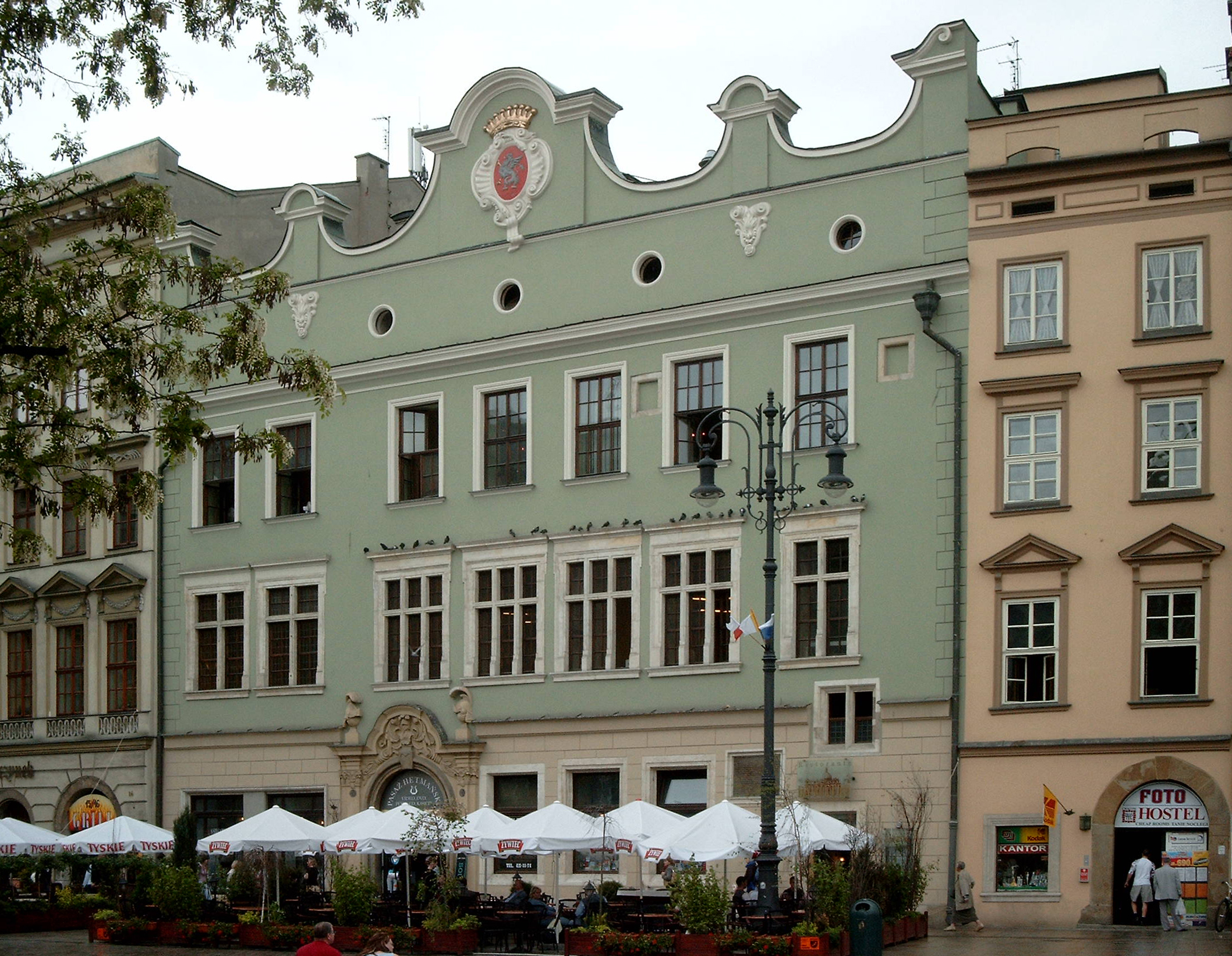
The Hetman Tenement House in Kraków

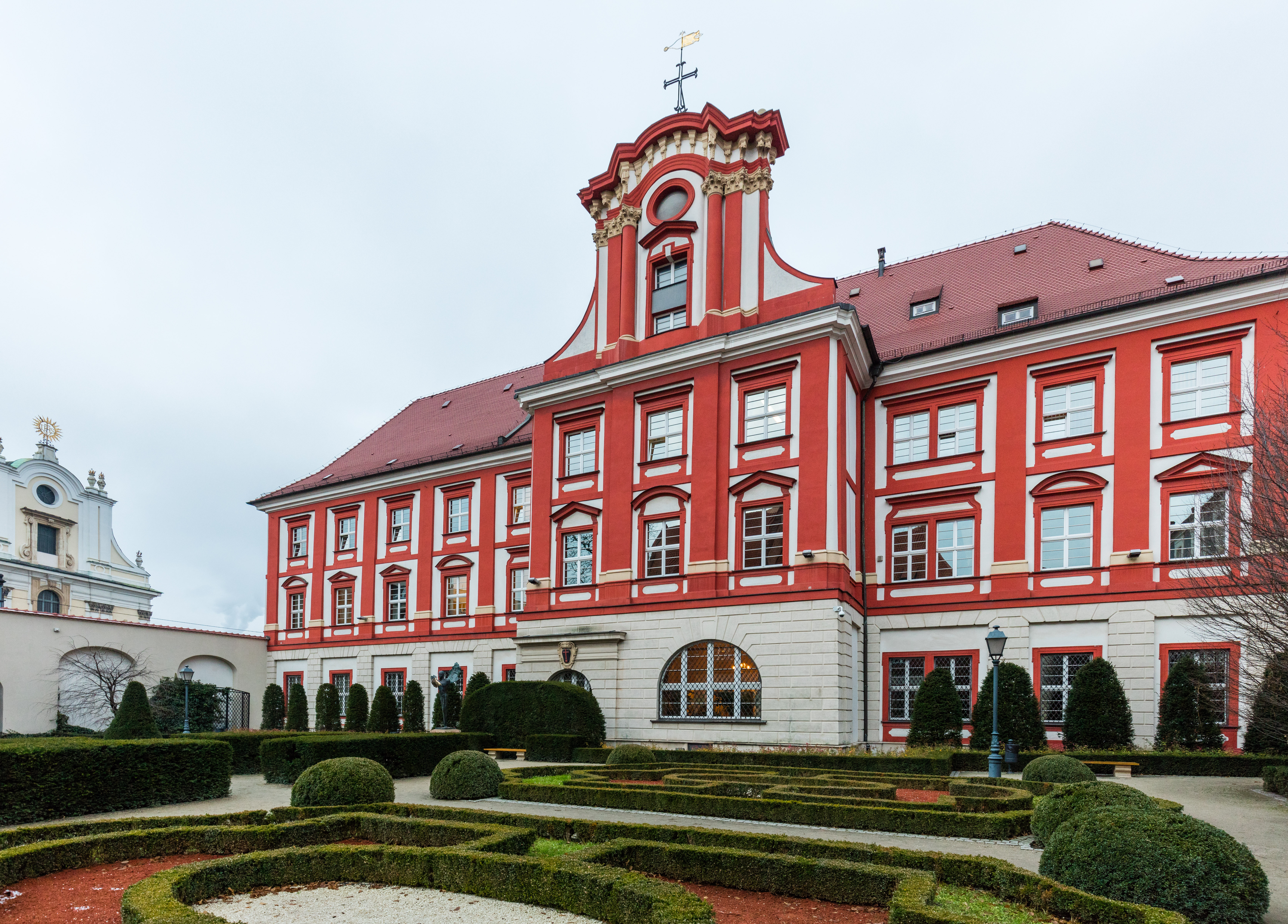
Relocated since 1947, the Ossolineum in Wrocław

== See also ==
- Ossolin

== Bibliography ==
- Zielińska, Teresa (1997). Poczet polskich rodów arystokratycznych (in Polish). WSiP. ISBN 83-0206429-7.
- Przybyszewski, Andrzej (2009). Ossolińscy herbu Topór (in Polish). Historyczna.pl. ISBN 978-83-927999-2-4.
