= Anna Potocka =

Anna Potocka may refer to:

- Anna Potocka, wife of Aleksander Dominik Kazanowski (1605–1648)
- Princess Anna Teresa Potocka née Ossolińska (1746–1810), Polish noblewoman
- Anna Tyszkiewicz (1779–1867), Polish noblewoman and diarist, married Aleksander Stanisław Potocki in 1805
