= Jerzy Ossoliński =

Polish nobleman (1595–1650)

Prince Jerzy Ossoliński
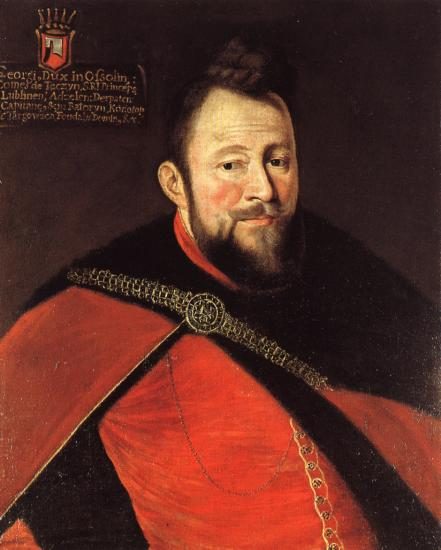
- Prince Ossoliński by Bartholomeus Strobel
- Coat of arms: Topór
- Born: 15 December 1595; Sandomierz, Poland
- Died: 9 August 1650 (aged 54); Warsaw, Poland
- Noble family: Ossoliński
- Spouse: Izabella Daniłowicz
- Issue: Franciszek Ossoliński; Urszula Brygida Ossolińska; Helena Tekla Ossolińska; Anna Teresa Ossolińska
- Father: Jan Zbigniew Ossoliński
- Mother: Anna Firlej h. Lewart

Prince Jerzy Ossoliński h. Topór (15 December 1595 – 9 August 1650) was a Polish nobleman (szlachcic), Crown Court Treasurer from 1632, governor (voivode) of Sandomierz from 1636, Prince of the Holy Roman Empire since 1634, Crown Deputy Chancellor from 1639, Great Crown Chancellor from 1643, starost of Bydgoszcz (1633), Luboml (1639), Puck and Bolim (1647), magnate, politician, statesman and diplomat. Famous for being extensively educated, he was a skillful politician and a persuasive public speaker.

He is the founder of the Baroque church in Klimontów.

== Biography ==
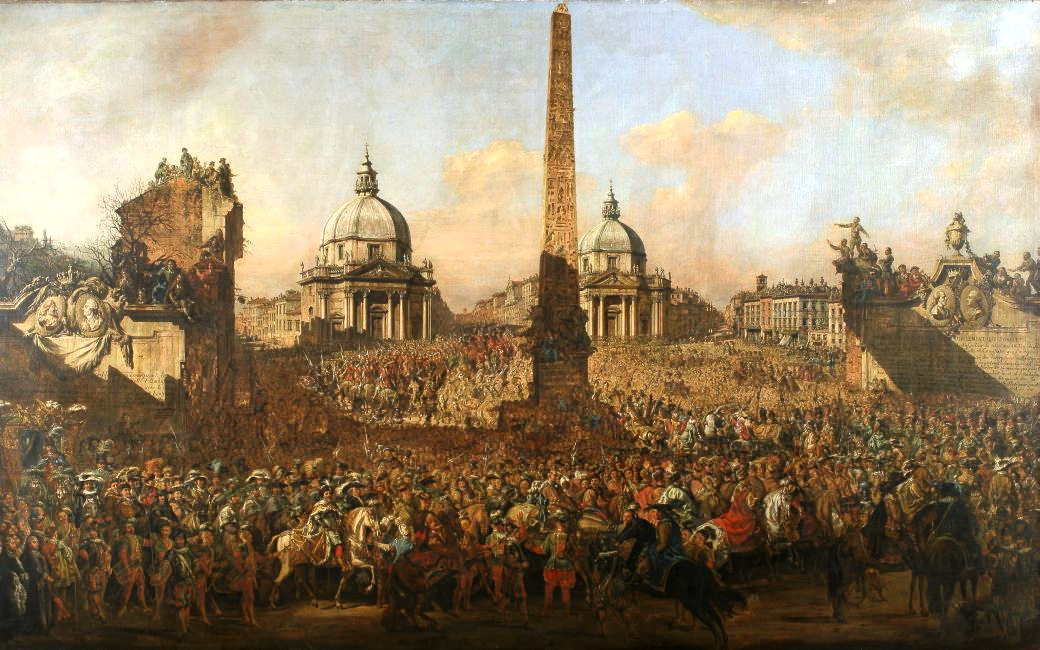
Entry of Jerzy Ossoliński into Rome in 1633 by Bernardo Bellotto. National Museum in Wrocław.

He was the Ambassador of Poland to England in 1621, and Ambassador of Poland to the Papal States in 1633. He negotiated with the Duchy of Prussia in 1635 and led another diplomatic mission to Emperor Ferdinand II and his parliament in Regensburg in 1636. As a leader of the pro-Habsburg faction at the royal court, he found an ally in the first wife of Władysław IV Vasa, Cecilia Renata of Austria, daughter of Ferdinand II. In 1639 and 1641 he once again negotiated with envoys from the Duchy of Prussia. A Catholic, he opposed Protestants and advocated limiting their rights and privileges. In his pro-Habsburg and anti-Protestant stance he was allied with Chancellor Albrycht Stanisław Radziwiłł and Queen Cecilia Renata.

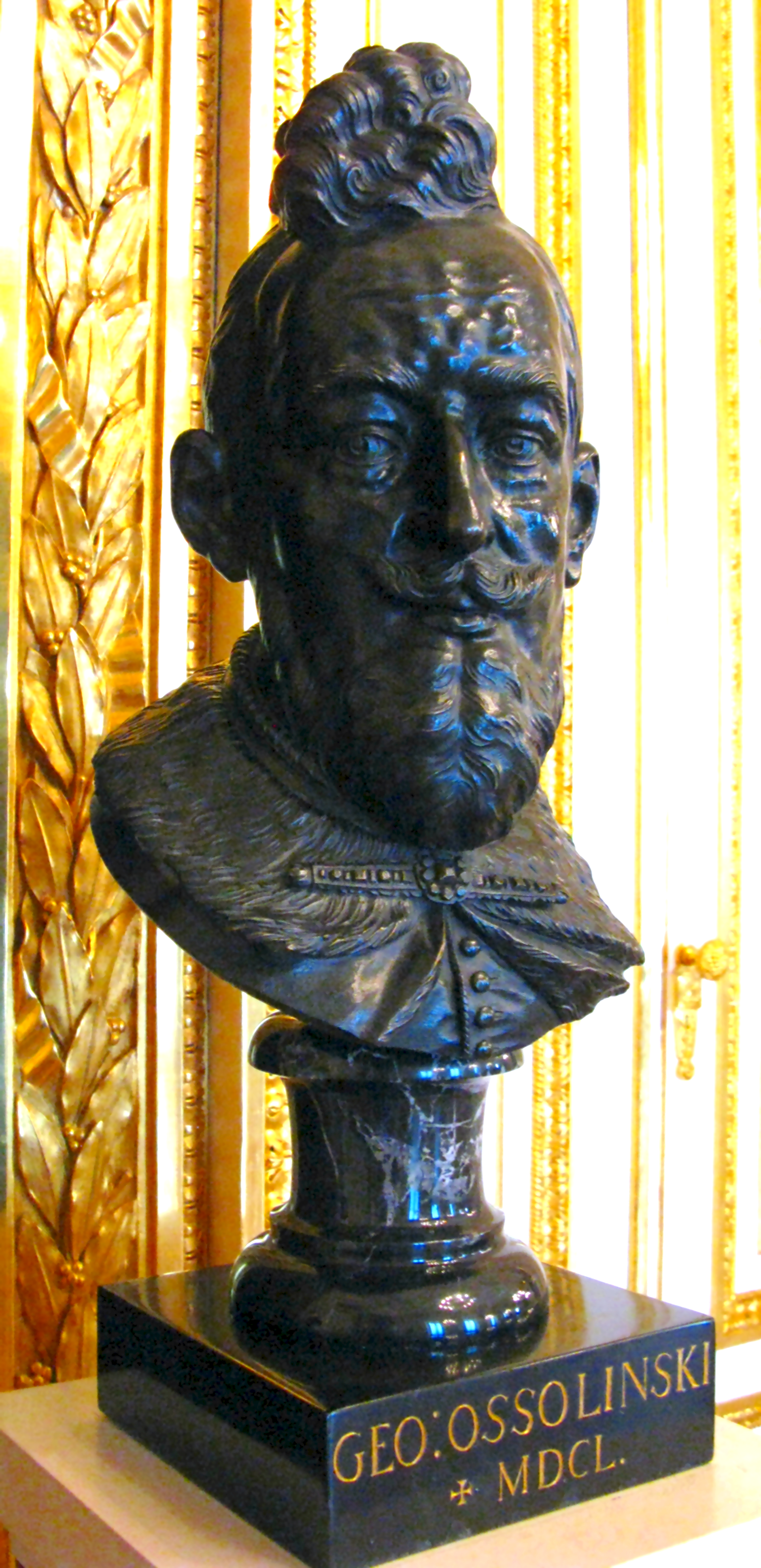
Bust of Jerzy Ossoliński at the Warsaw Royal Castle

In 1643 he was appointed Chancellor of the Crown. A close royal adviser, he often supported king Władysław IV Waza from the House of Vasa, arguing for increasing monarch power, although he was known for limiting and withdrawing his support if he knew it was impossible to win. Nonetheless, he was among the few who supported Władysław's plans in the late 1640s to wage an offensive war on the Ottoman Empire. He had few friends among the lesser szlachta, whom he mostly disliked and treated the Sejm and regional sejmiks as a 'necessary evil', although he rarely broke any laws.

From 1644 he switched his alignment from pro-Habsburg to pro-French and supported the second marriage of King Władysław with Ludwika Maria Gonzaga. During his life he became the enemy of Adam Kazanowski and Jeremi Wiśniowiecki, whose power diminished with the marriage between Władysław and Cecylia in 1637. Rival of bishop and chancellor Piotr Gembicki, whom he eventually forced to retire from politics in 1642, receiving his position of Great Crown Chancellor.

He was not the wealthiest of magnates, his possessions were very small compared to those of Radziwiłłs or Wiśniowieckis, but almost none of them were mortgaged or loaned. In 1635 he funded the expansion of his family castle in Ossolin. Between 1639 and 1642 he funded the palace in the capital city of Warsaw.

After the death of Władysław IV in 1648 he supported the election of his half brother John Casimir and was instrumental in his election.

Ossoliński also was in favour of treaties with the Cossacks, he took part in the negotiations and was an important contributor to the Treaty of Zborów in 1649.

He was a well regarded speaker and orator (he served twice as the Speaker of the Sejm in 1631 and 1635).

He was also an author of:

- Orationess... (1647)
- Mercurius Sarmatiae (1716)
- Pamiętnik (The Diary or Memoires) 1595–1621 (1952)

He also wrote the diaries of the embassy to Germany (1877) and to Rome (1883).

Brother of Krzysztof Ossoliński (1587–1645), voivode of Sandomierz (1638), and Maksymilian Ossoliński (1588–1665), chorąży sandomierski (1624), Deputy Court Treasurer.

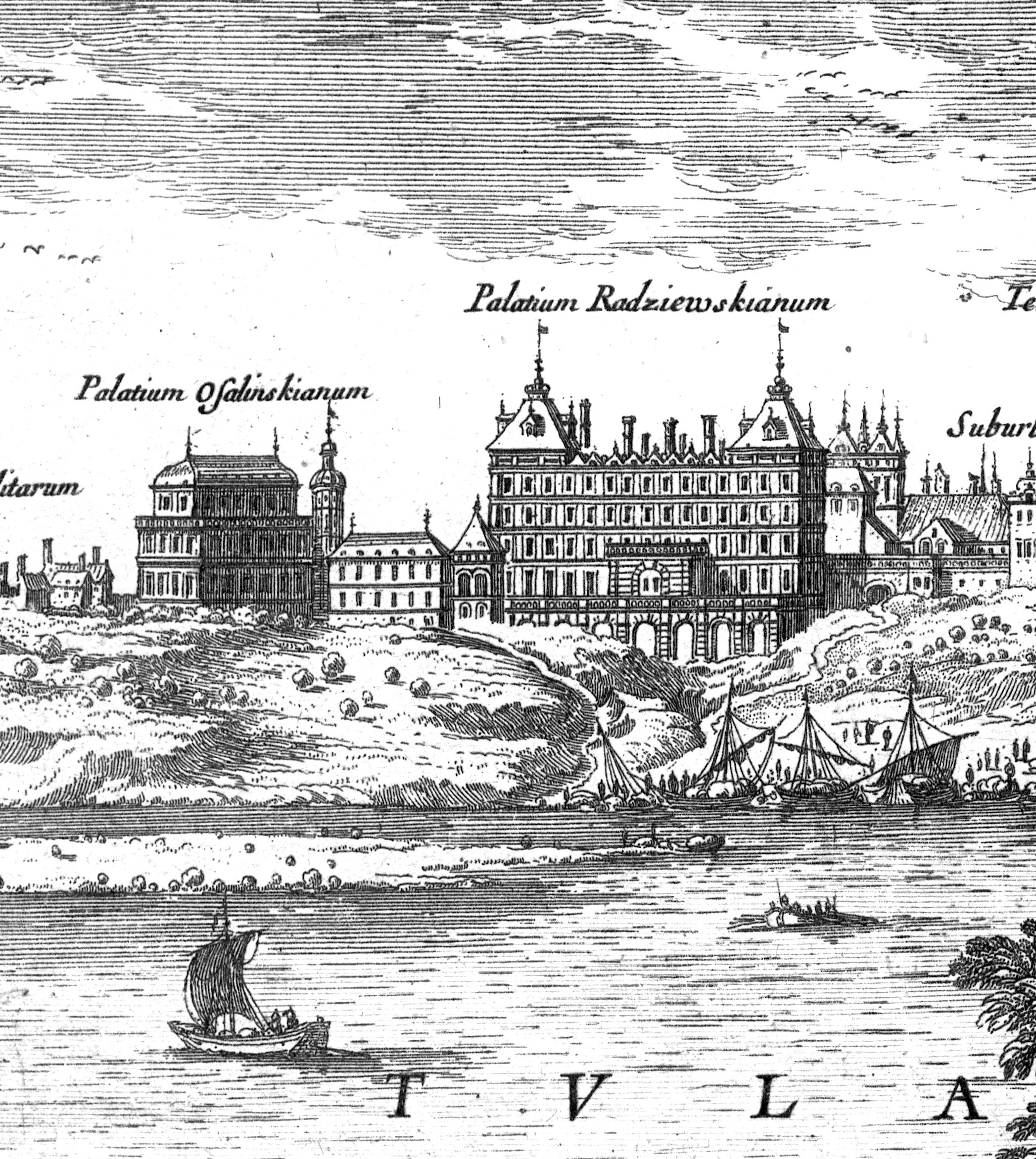
Ossoliński Palace (left) and Kazanowski Palace (right) in Warsaw. They were both plundered and burned down by Swedes and Germans of Brandenburg in 1650s.

== Marriage and issue ==
Jerzy married Izabella Daniłłowicz h. Sas in 1620 in Lwów and had four children:

- Prince Franciszek Ossoliński (died 1648), married to Katarzyna Działyńska h. Ogończyk
- Princess Urszula Brygida Ossolińska, married to Samuel Kalinowski h. Kalinowa (died at the Batih massacre), son of Hetman Marcin Kalinowski
- Princess Helena Tekla Ossolińska (died 1687), married to Prince Aleksander Michał Lubomirski
- Princess Anna Teresa Ossolińska (died 1651), married to Zygmunt Doenhoff, son of Kasper Doenhoff

== Bibliography ==
- Błażejewski Stanisław, Kutta Janusz, Romaniuk Marek: Bydgoski Słownik Biograficzny. Tom III. Bydgoszcz 1996. ISBN 83-85327-32-0, str. 107-109
- Bohomolec Franciszek, Życie Jerzego Ossolińskiego, kanclerza wielkiego koronnego, lubelskiego, lubomskiego, lubaczowskiego, bogusławskiego, brodnickiego, ryckiego, derpskiego, adzielskiego, stanisławowskiego i bydgoskiego starosty T. 1 i 2 Kraków 1860
- Ludwik Kubala, Szkice historyczne seria 1, wyd.3 Kraków 1896; Jerzy Ossoliński Lwów 1883 T. 1, T. 2, Jerzy Ossoliński wyd. 2 rozszerzone, Warszawa Ossolineum 1924.
- Polski Słownik Biograficzny t. 24 s. 403
- A True Copy of the Latine Oration of the Excellent George Ossolinski, Count Palatine of Tenizyn, and Sendomyria, Chamberlain to the Kings Maiestie of Poland, and Suethland, and Embassadour to the Kings most Excellent Maiesty. As it was pronounced to his Maiestie at White-Hall by the said Embassadour, on Sunday the 11. of March, 1620.
