= Jóźwiak =

Jóźwiak is a Polish-language surname. It is a patronymic surname derived from the given name Józef. Alternative forms include Juźwiak and Ukrainian: Юзьвяк, transliterated Yuzviak.

Notable people with this surname include:

- Bogdan Jóźwiak (born 1970), Polish footballer
- Bogna Jóźwiak (born 1983), Polish fencer
- Brian Jozwiak (born 1963), American football player
- Franciszek Jóźwiak (1895–1966), Polish communist politician
- Jakub Jóźwiak, winner of You Can Dance – Po Prostu Tańcz! (season 5)
- Jerzy Jóźwiak (1939–1982), Polish footballer
- Kamil Jóźwiak (born 1998), Polish footballer
- Łukasz Jóźwiak (born 1985), Polish ice dancer
- Marek Jóźwiak (born 1967), Polish footballer
- Małgorzata Wiese-Jóźwiak (born 1961), Polish chess player
- Greg Joswiak, Senior Vice President, Worldwide Marketing at Apple Inc.
- Valeriya Yuzviak (born 1999), Ukrainian rhythmic gymnast
