= Józefowicz =

Józefowicz is a Polish patronymic surname of East Slavic origin derived from the given name Józef with the patronymic suffix '-icz' borrowed from East Slavic '-ich'. Russian counterpart: Yuzefovich. Notable people with the surname include:

- Janusz Józefowicz (born 1959), Polish director, choreographer, actor and dancer
- Lucjan Józefowicz (1935–2023), Polish cyclist
- Olga Józefowicz (1904–1979), known professionally as Olga Olgina, Polish coloratura soprano, teacher and pianist
- Roman Józefowicz (born 1958), Polish footballer

== See also ==
- Józefowicz family, Polish-Jewish family, ennobled without conversion to Christianity
- Meir Ezofowicz
