= Jan Ponętowski =

Polish politician (c. 1540-c. 1598)

Jan Ponętowski (c. 1540–c.1598) was a Polish politician, diplomat and academic. He was known to be a major supporter of the Executionist movement. He was associated with the Akademia Krakowska (Jagiellonian University) in 1569 and was a bibliophile.
