= Józef Kanty Ossoliński =

Magnate in the Polish–Lithuanian Commonwealth (1707–1780)

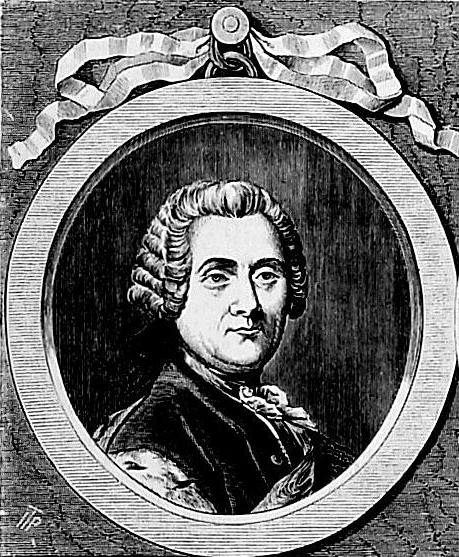
- Józef Ossoliński
- Coat of arms: Topór
- Born: 1707
- Died: 7 October 1780 (aged 72–73); Rymanów
- Noble family: Ossoliński
- consort: Teresa Stadnicka
- Issue: Maksymilian Ossoliński; Józef Salezy Ossoliński; Anna Teresa Ossolińska; Marianna Ossolińska
- Father: Franciszek Maksymilian Ossoliński
- Mother: Katarzyna Miączyńska

Józef Jan Kanty Ossoliński (1707–1780) was a magnate in the Polish–Lithuanian Commonwealth. Supported Stanisław Leszczyński, although abandoned him in 1733 when his cause looked worse and from 1735 he became a supporter of August III the Saxon. He became a close ally of hetman Jan Klemens Branicki and his political group, and one of the most known opponents of the familia. From 1757 he became the voivode of Wołyń and received the Order of the White Eagle. He opposed the election of Stanisław August Poniatowski, who at that time received support from the Russian Empire. Supporter of the Bar Confederation. In 1775 he resigned his voivode office and retreated from politics.

Son of Franciszek Maksymilian Ossoliński and Katarzyna Miączyńska. Father of Maksymilian Ossoliński, Józef Salezy Ossoliński, Anna Teresa Ossolińska and Marianna Ossolińska.

== Biography ==
As many magnates in the Commonwealth, after a period of education at home he toured Europe. Józef Kanty spent most of his time abroad in France, where he became involved with the pro-French faction in Polish politics supporting king Stanisław Leszczyński. In 1729 he appeared on the Polish political scene as a deputy to the Sejm from the Livonia (Inflanty) region. From then he would be a common deputy, elected to many Sejms. His main interest in politics would revolve around various issues related to military.

In 1730 he entered military, becoming a captain or major of chorągiew unit under hetman Jan Klemens Branicki. He would be a close ally of Branicki for many years.

In 1730 his father, with the approval of the king, passed two of his starostwo to him (sandomierskie and chmielnickie). Around that time he also married Teresa Stadnicka.

After the death of August II of Poland he engaged in the campaign of gathering political support for Stanisław Leszczyński. After Leszczyński's defeat he decided to distance himself from his camp and remain in country, unlike his father who remained in France with exiled Leszczyński. From that point he would ally himself to the court faction of the new king of Poland, August III Saxon.

In 1738 he became the Court Chorąży of the Crown.

From 1750 he would again approach the pro-French faction, especially as one of his mentors and allies, hetman Branicki, would be allied with it. With the help of hetman Branicki he would become the voivode of Wołyń in 1757. He received the Order of the White Eagle in the same year.

After the death of August III he supported the election of the new Wettin candidate and opposed the election of Stanisław August Poniatowski, who at that time received support from the Russian Empire. Eventually he was defeated by pro-Russian familia' faction. He opposed the Russian ingenerce in Polish politics and demanded the withdrawal of the Russian forces from the Commonwealth, but to no avail. He supported the actions of those who wanted to take military action against the Russian but few besides him offered real support (money and men) and the notion subsided. When he returned to his estate, he was arrested by Russian forces, imprisoned for several months and forced to rebuke of all his anti-Russian manifests. Released afterwards, for the next few years he tried working with the pro-Russian faction but eventually was disappointed by them again after the excesses of the Repnin Sejm.

Eventually he became the supporter of the Bar Confederation, first discreetly, later openly. In 1775 he resigned his voivode office and retreated from politics.
