= Hieronim Ossoliński =

Polish statesman

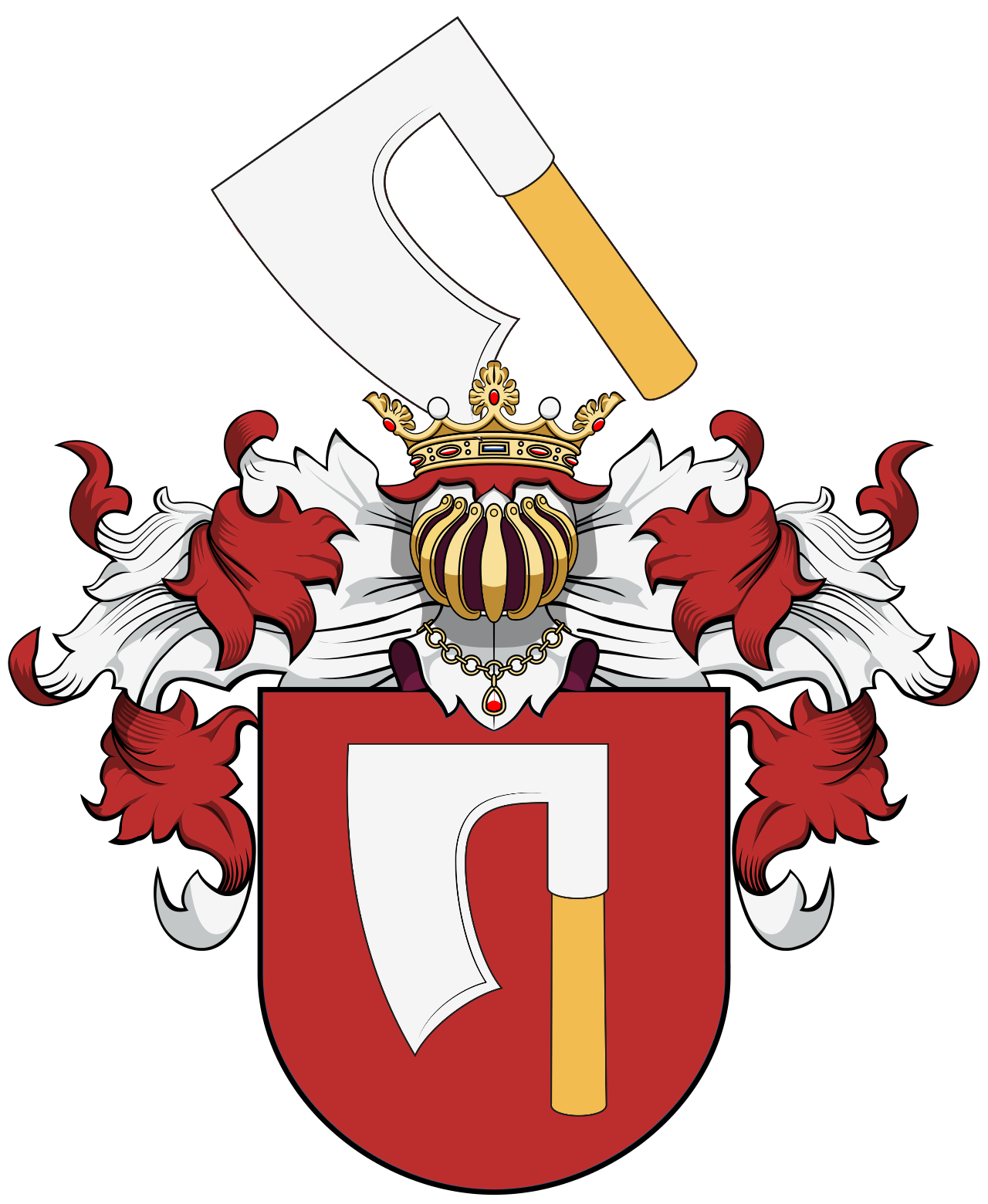
- Coat of arms: Topór
- Born: Unknown
- Died: 1575 or 1576
- Buried: Goźlice, Poland
- Noble family: Ossolinski
- Spouse: Katarzyna Zborowska
- Father: Paweł Ossoliński
- Mother: Zbigniewa Słupecka
- Occupation: Kasztelan of Sandomierz and Wojnicz

Hieronim Ossoliński, (born ? – died 1575 or 1576), coat of arms Topór, was a Polish statesman, kasztelan of Sandomierz and Wojnicz, a delegate to the Sejm of 1569 and one of the signatories of the Union of Lublin, which formally united Poland and Lithuania into the Polish–Lithuanian Commonwealth. Ossoliński was a Calvinist, and a leader of Protestants in the province of Małopolska during the reign of king Zygmunt August. Ossoliński was also one of the leaders of the Executionist movement, which sought to reform 16th century Polish politics.

== Early life ==
In his youth, Hieronim was sent by his family to study abroad. During this time, most likely in Germany, he became familiar with Calvinism, converted, and would remain a faithful adherent and advocate for Protestantism throughout his life. He also served under Gian Giacomo Medici in Italy and participated in the taking of Siena.

== Executionist movement and Union of Lublin ==
Ossoliński was one of the leaders of the Executionist movement, which sought to reform 16th century Polish politics. As an "Executionist", Ossoliński promoted the return of state lands illegally seized by some magnates back to the crown, an increase in the powers of the lesser and medium nobility (szlachta), a curtailment of the rights of the Catholic clergy, enforcement of separation of powers in regard to the holding of public offices, religious tolerance, and reform of public finances.

Ossoliński, like most other Executionists was also a strong proponent of the unification between the Grand Duchy of Lithuania and Crown of Poland. He was considered a main force behind the treaty of unification (Union of Lublin) which was established at the 1569 Sejm. Before the treaty was implemented, Ossoliński argued that Poland and Lithuania were already technically united through the agreements made between Polish king Władysław II Jagiełło (originally from Lithuania) and the Grand Duke Vytautas, and was probably the author of a political pamphlet De unione Lithwaniea ("On the Lithuanian Union"). He was one of the signatories of the treaty.

Continuing this political line, Ossoliński and other Executionists sought closer political integration between the various provinces of the Polish–Lithuanian Commonwealth that had been established by the 1569 Sejm; Prussia, Lithuania, Ruthenia and "Korona".

== Protestant leader and advocate for religious toleration ==
Along with Rafał Leszczyński, the voivode of Brześć Kujawski, Ossoliński proposed the establishment of a national church in Poland, with king Zygmunt August as its head. The original proposal envisioned the establishment of such a Church with approval from the Papacy, although both Ossoliński and Leszczyński were willing to cut all ties with Rome if such approval was not granted. The two politicians made the motion at a Sejm of Piotrków in 1555, but it was not accepted. Three years later, at another sejm, Ossoliński unsuccessfully proposed that Catholic bishops were to be prohibited from sitting in the Polish Senate.

In 1573, Ossoliński was one of the signatories of the Warsaw Confederation. The confederation issued a document which formally and legally established freedom of religion in the Polish–Lithuanian Commonwealth. While previously religious tolerance was a de facto policy of Poland and the Polish–Lithuanian Commonwealth, the Confederation made it constitutionally de jure. In the same year Ossoliński supported the election of Henry of Valois to the throne of Poland and took part in the coronation. Soon, however, Ossoliński came to oppose the king and supported his dethronement.

== Family and personal life ==
Hieronim was the son of Paweł Ossoliński and Zbigniewa Słupecka. Probably circa 1546 he married Katarzyna Zborowska (of the Zborowski family). They had eight surviving children:

- Jan Ossoliński (1576) – Starosta of Płock
- Hieronim Ossoliński (died 1581)
- Piotr Ossoliński (died 1580)
- Mikołaj Ossoliński (died 1598) – Lord of Klimontow
- Zofia, married Stanisław Drohojowski
- Jan Zbigniew Ossoliński (1555–1623) – Starosta of Sandomierz, chancellor to the King of Poland.
- Andrzej Ossoliński (1616) – Żupnik of Ruthenia
- Marcin Ossoliński – Crown Rotamaster

He most likely forced his son, Jan Zbigniew Ossoliński, to convert to Calvinism. After his father's death, Jan, as well as several of the other children reverted to Catholicism.

He died around 1576 and was buried in Goźlice, in a church which he had converted into a Calvinist Zbór (in Poland–Lithuania and Bohemia a type of Protestant place of worship). His tombstone was sculpted by the Italian-Polish architect Santi Gucci, and had been commissioned by Hieronim himself. It was destroyed during World War I, in 1915, and restored after World War II on the basis of archival photographs.
