= Ossolin =

Ossolin may refer to the following places:

- Ossolin, Masovian Voivodeship (east-central Poland)
- Ossolin, Podlaskie Voivodeship (north-east Poland)
- Ossolin, Świętokrzyskie Voivodeship (south-central Poland)
