= Krzyżtopór =

Coordinates: 50.7139°N 21.3106°E

Krzyżtopór Palace
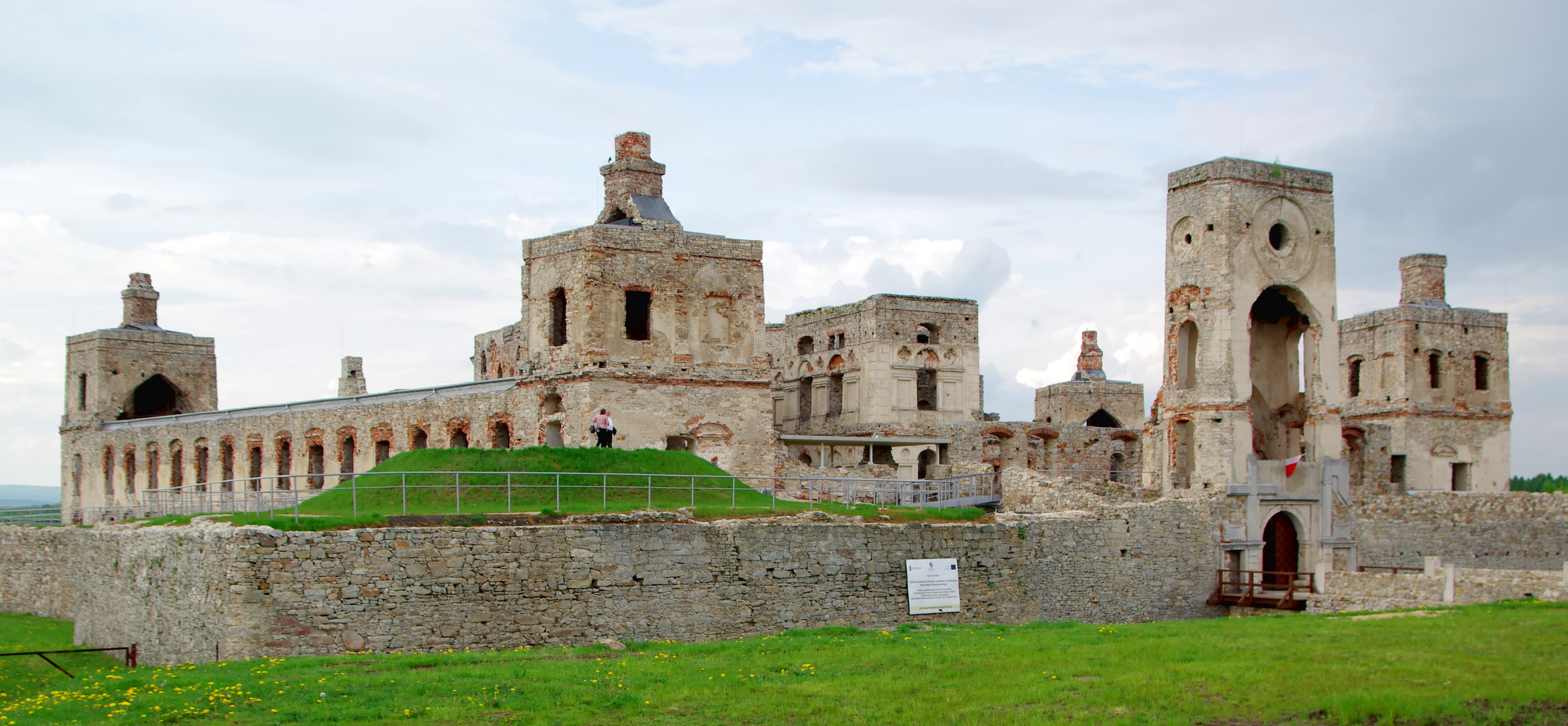
- View on the main gate, with symbols of cross and axe in 2014.
- Interactive map of the Krzyżtopór Palace area

General information
- Architectural style: Polish Mannerism-early Baroque
- Location: Ujazd, Poland
- Construction started: 1621
- Completed: ca. 1644
- Client: Krzysztof Ossoliński

Design and construction
- Architect: Wawrzyniec Senes

Historic Monument of Poland
- Designated: 2018-04-20
- Reference no.: Dz. U. z 2018 r. poz. 943

Krzyżtopór (Polish pronunciation: [kʂɨʂˈtɔpur]) is a castle located in the village of Ujazd, Iwaniska commune, Opatów County, Świętokrzyskie Voivodeship, in southern Poland. It was originally built by a Polish nobleman and Voivode of Sandomierz, Krzysztof Ossoliński (1587–1645). The castle was partially destroyed during the Swedish invasion known as The Deluge in 1655, and then reduced to ruins during the war of the Bar Confederation by the Russians in 1770.

== Construction ==
It is unknown when the construction of this impressive fortress began. Krzysztof Ossoliński's father, Jan Zbigniew Ossoliński, gave him the village of Ujazd in 1619; however, first documented proof of the construction of the castle comes from 1627, when it was uncompleted. The nobleman probably finished it in 1644, having spent the enormous sum of 30 million Polish złotys on the work. Unfortunately, Ossoliński did not enjoy it for long, as he died suddenly the next year in Kraków.

The castle was inherited by Ossoliński's son Krzysztof Baldwin Ossoliński, who died in 1649 in the Battle of Zborów. After his death, the formidable complex was purchased by the family of the Denhoffs, then by the Kalinowskis.

In 1655, during the Swedish invasion of Poland, the castle was captured by the Swedes, who occupied it until 1657, pillaging the entire complex. The damage to the structure was so extensive that after the Swedes’ withdrawal it was not rebuilt, as it was deemed too costly. Several noble families (the Morsztyns, the Wiśniowieckis and the Pacs) lived in the best-preserved, western wing, but the castle otherwise remained in ruins.

In 1770, during the Bar Confederation, Krzyżtopór, defended by the Confederate units, was seized by the Russians, who completed the building's ruin. Reportedly, last known inhabitant of the complex, Stanisław Sołtyk, lived there in the years 1782–87, after which time Krzyżtopór has been deserted.

During the Second World War, the complex was again ransacked. A partial remodelling took place in 1971, and in 1980 the Polish Ministry of Internal Affairs decided to rebuild it for use as a rest area for officers. This work was halted in 1981, when martial law was imposed in Poland.

== Design ==
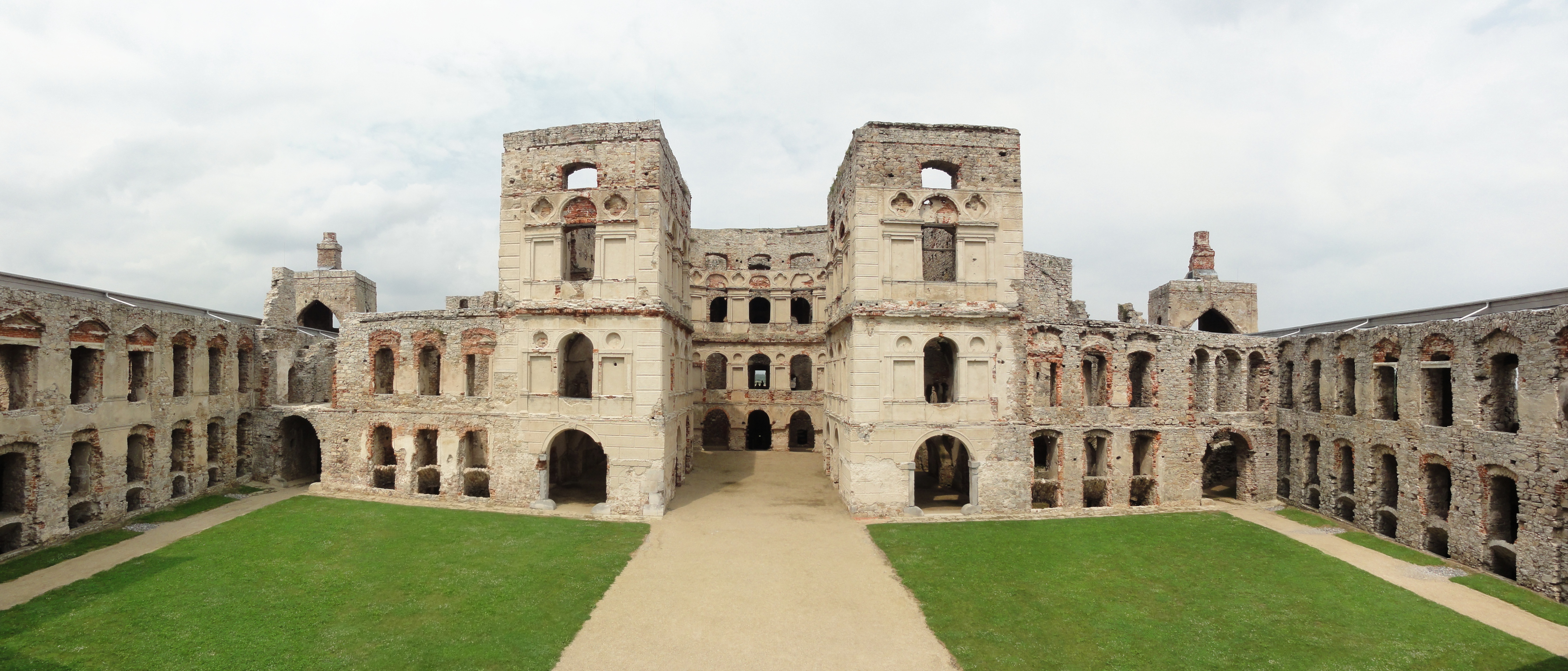
The inner courtyard of the castle

Even though extensive research has been carried out through the years, historians have been unable to fully explain all aspects of the complex. No documents have been preserved that have enabled the determination of either the date of commencement of the castle's construction or the date of its completion. The name of the architect is also unknown. Krzysztof Ossoliński was enamoured with magic. while the unique symmetry of the castle is evident even in its ruined state, the hidden meanings that may have been incorporated into virtually every part of the castle are not obvious.

The very name of the complex is a mysterious one. Krzysztof Ossoliński officially named it Krzysztofory, which is derived from Latin word Christophoros. Later, the name changed to Krzyżtopór, which is a compounding of two Polish words – krzyż ("cross", a symbol of the Catholic faith and Ossoliński's policies) and topór ("axe", the charge from the family's coat of arms). Both symbols can be seen on the gate of the castle. Also, above the gate there is the date 1631, but to what this date refers has not been firmly established.

The castle, built by Swiss engineer Wawrzyniec (Lawrence) Senes (probably born in Sent, Switzerland), is a typical example of the so-called palazzo in fortezza – an intermingling of both palace and fortress. The total size of the complex is 1.3 hectares; the length of the perimeter walls is 700 meters; the total area of all interior rooms is around 70 000 square meters. The basic design was based on the palace of Cardinal Alexander Farnese, located in the Italian village of Caprarola. Reportedly, the castle once had 365 windows (as many as days of the year), 52 rooms (as many as weeks of the year), 12 ballrooms (as many as months of the year) and also 4 towers (as many as 4 seasons of the year). For defensive purposes, the castle was erected upon a rocky hill, making it impossible for an enemy to organize an underground attack.

Krzyżtopór was furnished with amenities that were rarely seen in the 17th century, such as ventilation and heating system, and unique waterworks that provided all rooms with fresh water. Allegedly, the ceiling in one of dining rooms was made up of an aquarium containing exotic fish. Additionally, a system of dumbwaiters carried food from pantries to the upper floors.

== Currently ==
The castle, without convenient proximity to main roads and rail connections, is visited by relatively few tourists. However, as walls, bastions and moat are relatively well-preserved, its magnitude is still very impressive. Though it is regarded as a permanent ruin, since around 90 percent of the walls have been preserved, reconstruction has been planned several times. Currently, efforts have been underway to roof the entire complex; however, this ambitious project lacks sufficient funding.

The castle was prominently featured in James Michener's 1981 novel, Poland. Several local legends also involve the castle. According to one story, the Ossoliński father and son were punished by God for their vanity, in that neither of them was able to enjoy the castle for long. Other legends claim that under the ruins there is a hidden treasure of the Ossoliński family, guarded by the ghost of Krzysztof Baldwin Ossoliński.

On May 22, 2023 a famous South Korean K-pop boy group Enhypen released the music video for the song "Bite me" which was filmed in this castle.

== Gallery ==
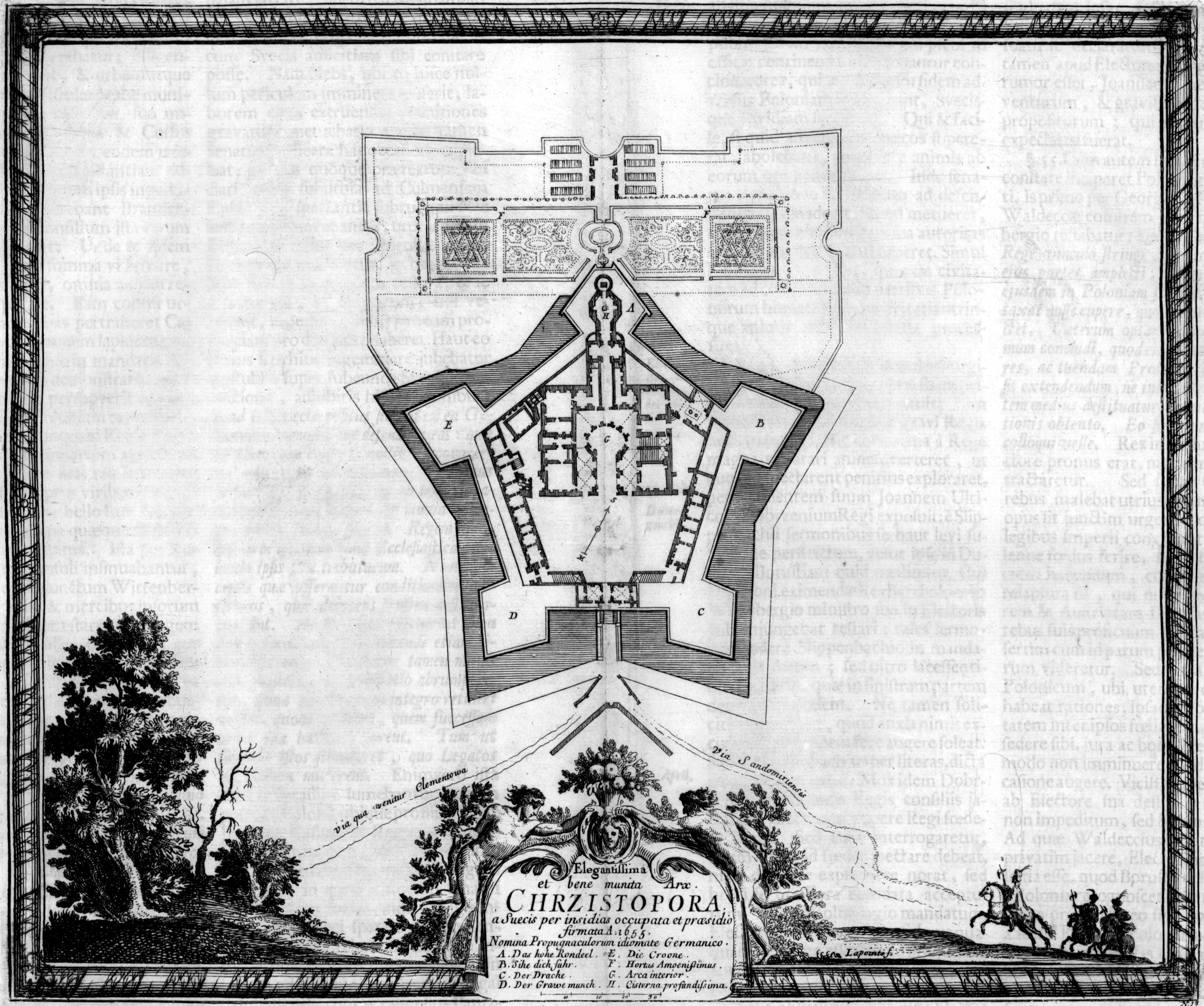
Plan of the castle from around 1655

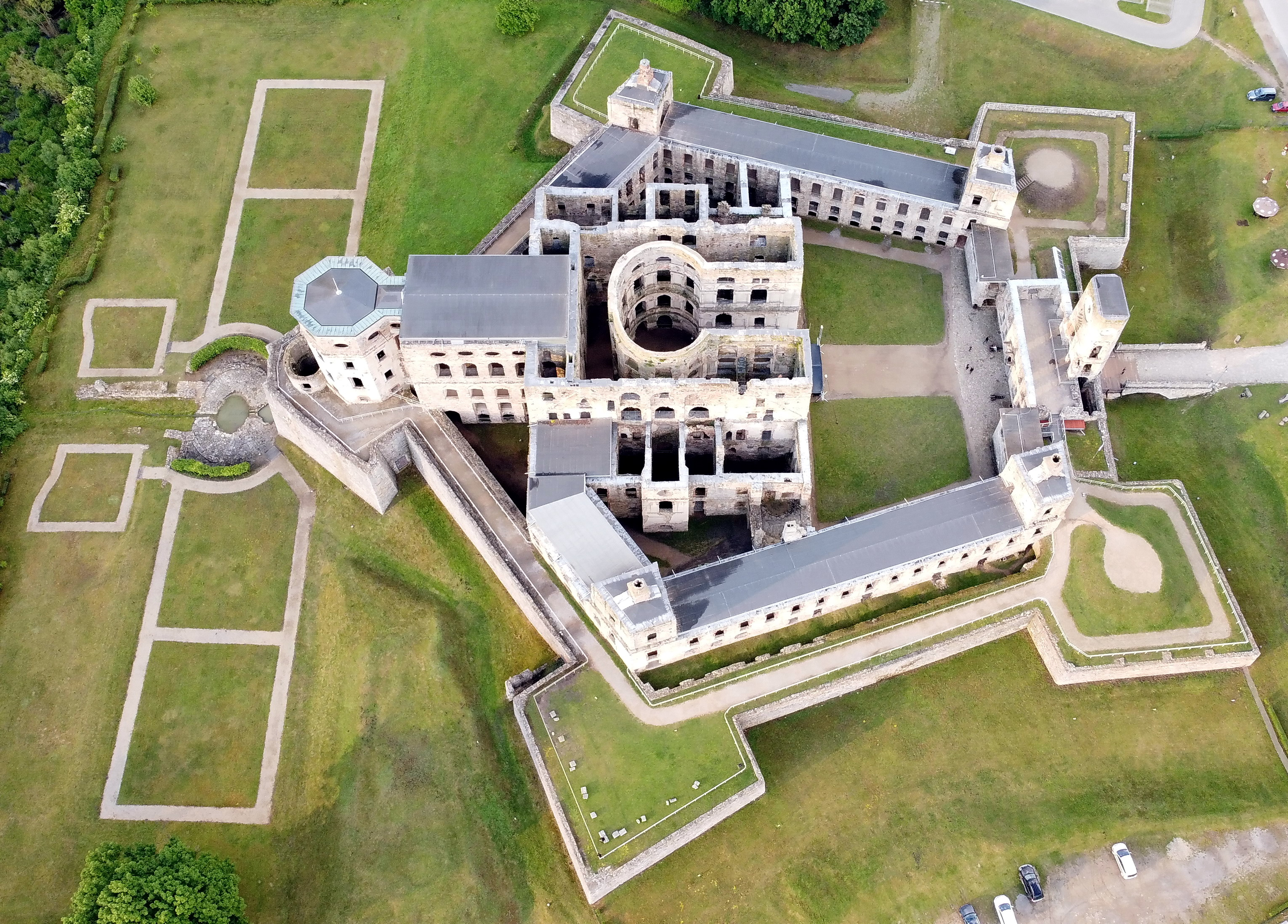
Aerial view of the castle

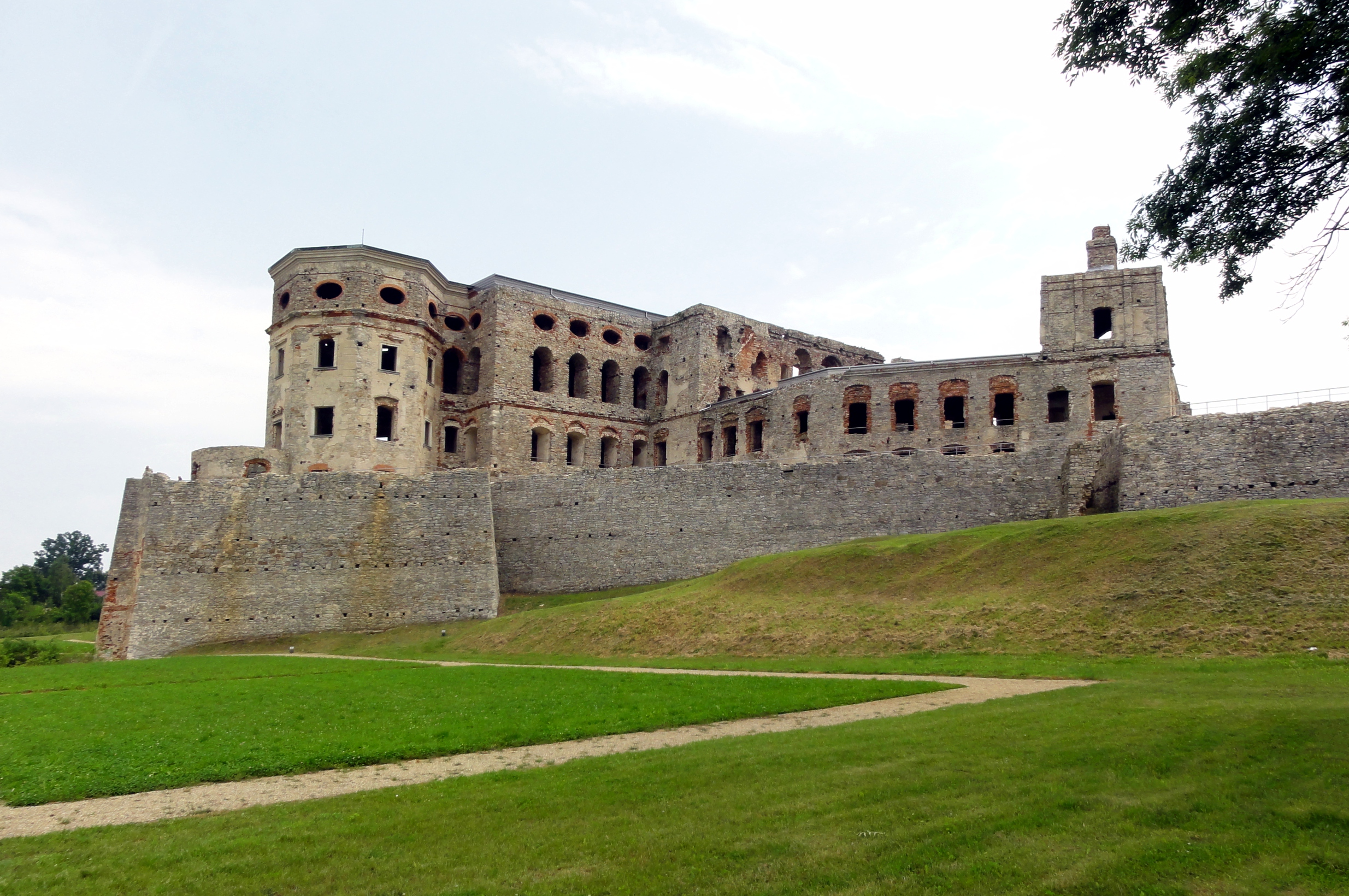

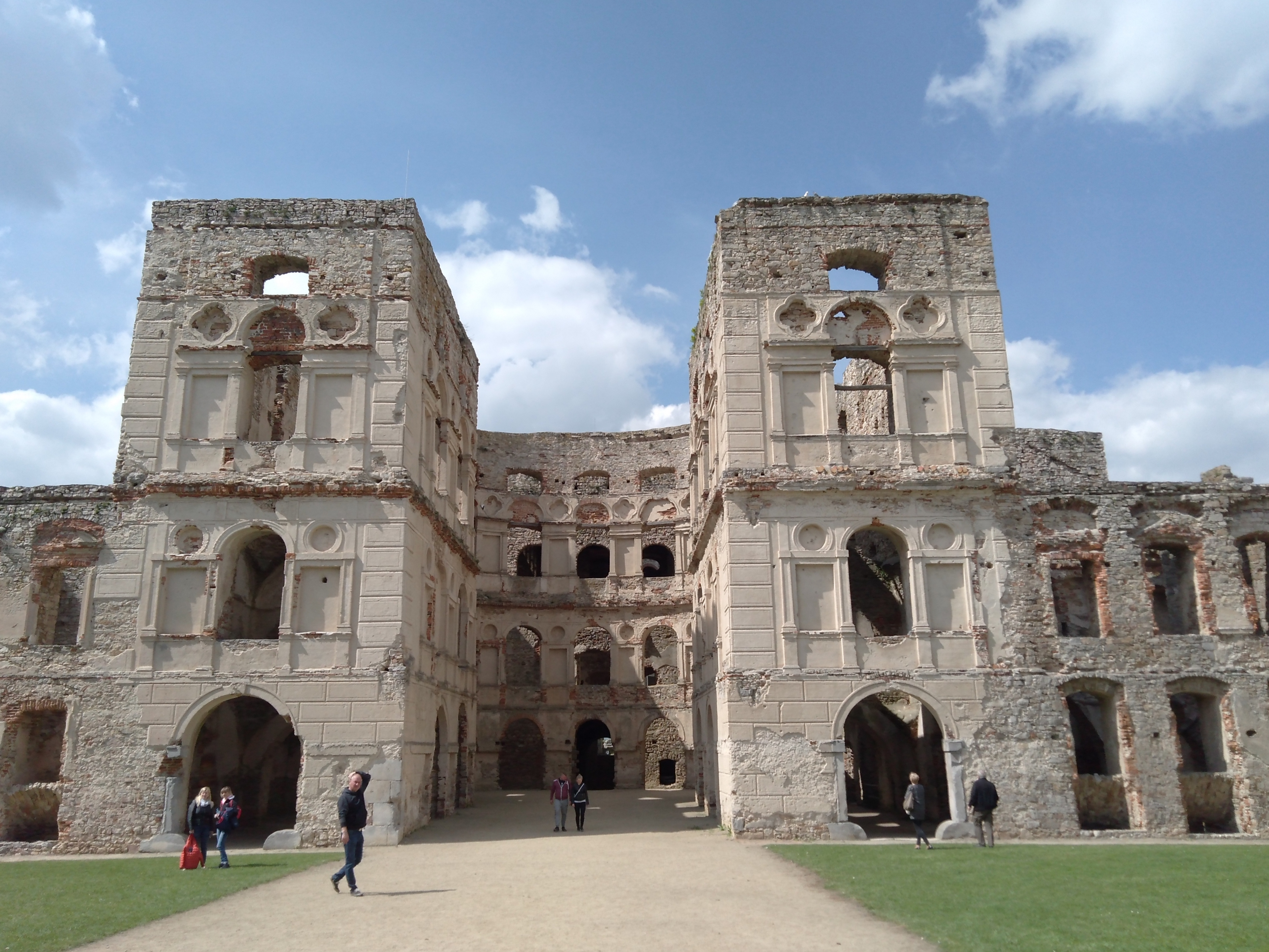
Inner courtyard

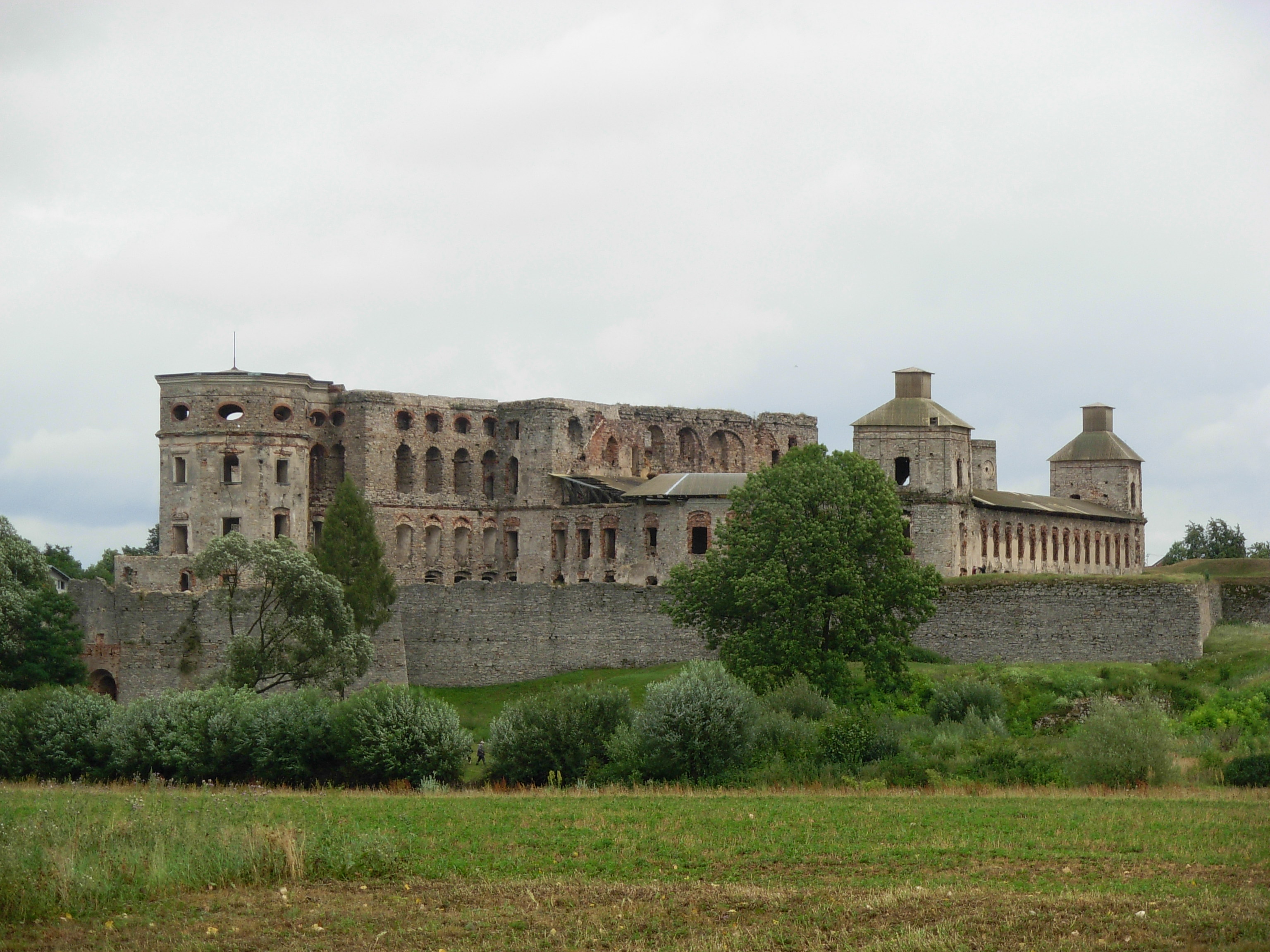
An external view of the castle

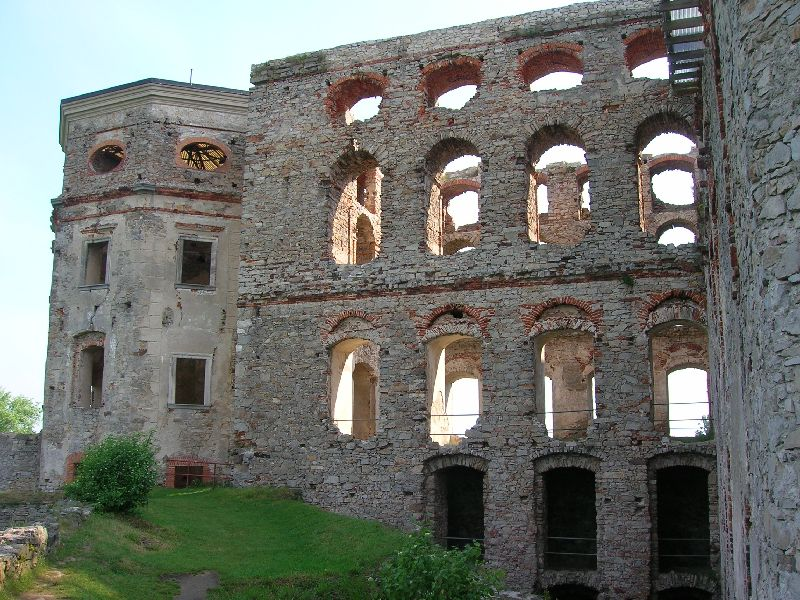
Ruins of the castle

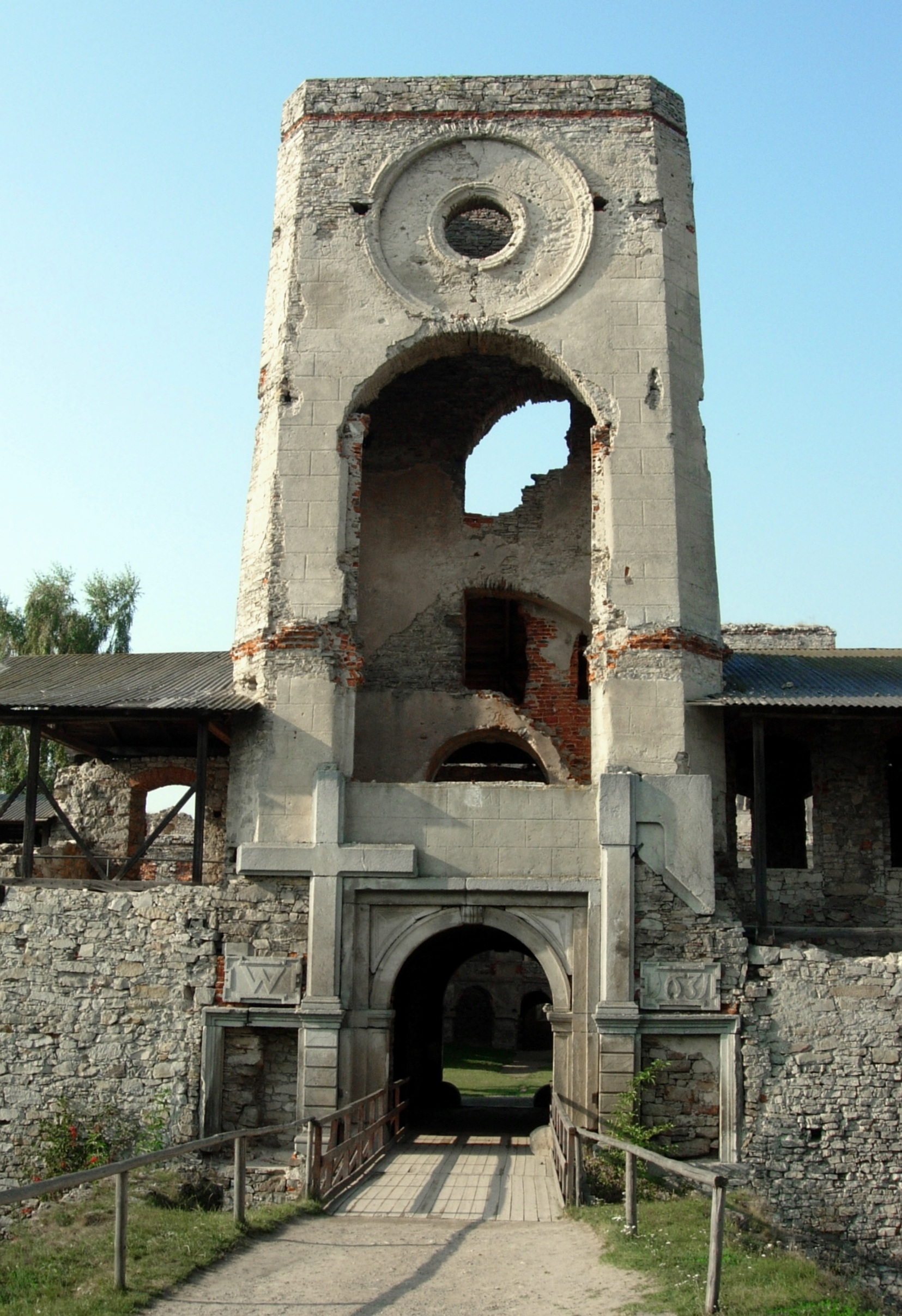
The ruins of Krzyżtopór Castle

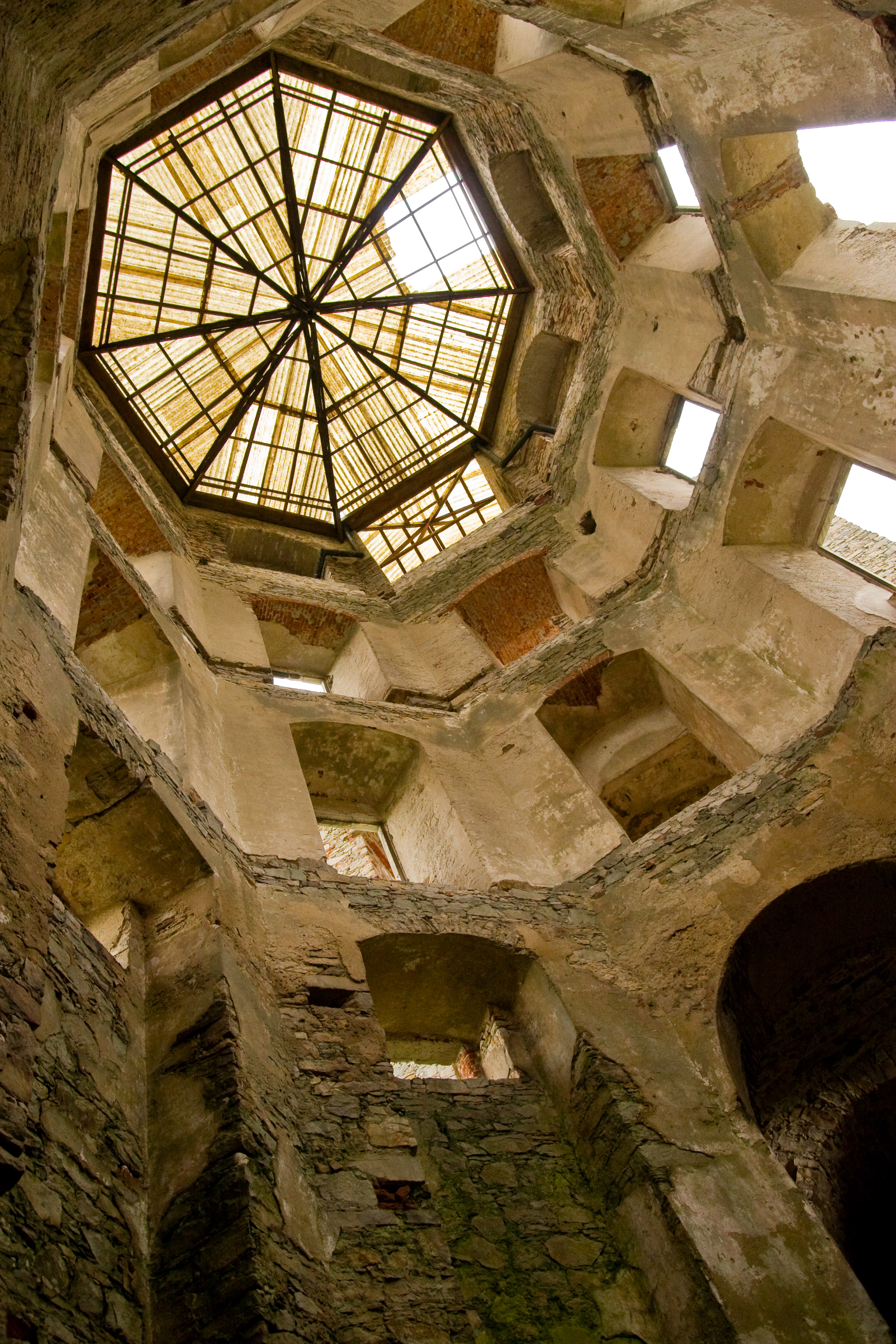
Interior of the castle

== See also ==
- List of mannerist structures in Southern Poland
- Baroque in Poland
- Castles in Poland

== Bibliography ==
- Marek Żukow-Karczewski, Krzyżtopór - twierdza magnacka Ossolińskich w Ujeździe / Krzyżtopór - lordly fortress belonging to the Ossoliński family at Ujazd, "Aura" 7, 1989, p. 20-22. (pl/en)
