= Yuzefovich =

Yuzefovich is a Russian-language surname. East Slavic counterpart: Józefowicz. Notable people with the surname include:

- Galina Yuzefovich (born 1975), Russian literary critic, teacher, and columnist
- Leonid Yuzefovich (born 1947), Russian writer
- Mikhail Yuzefovich (1802–1889), deputy commissioner of the Kiev school district
