= Executionist movement =

Political movement in 16th-century Poland

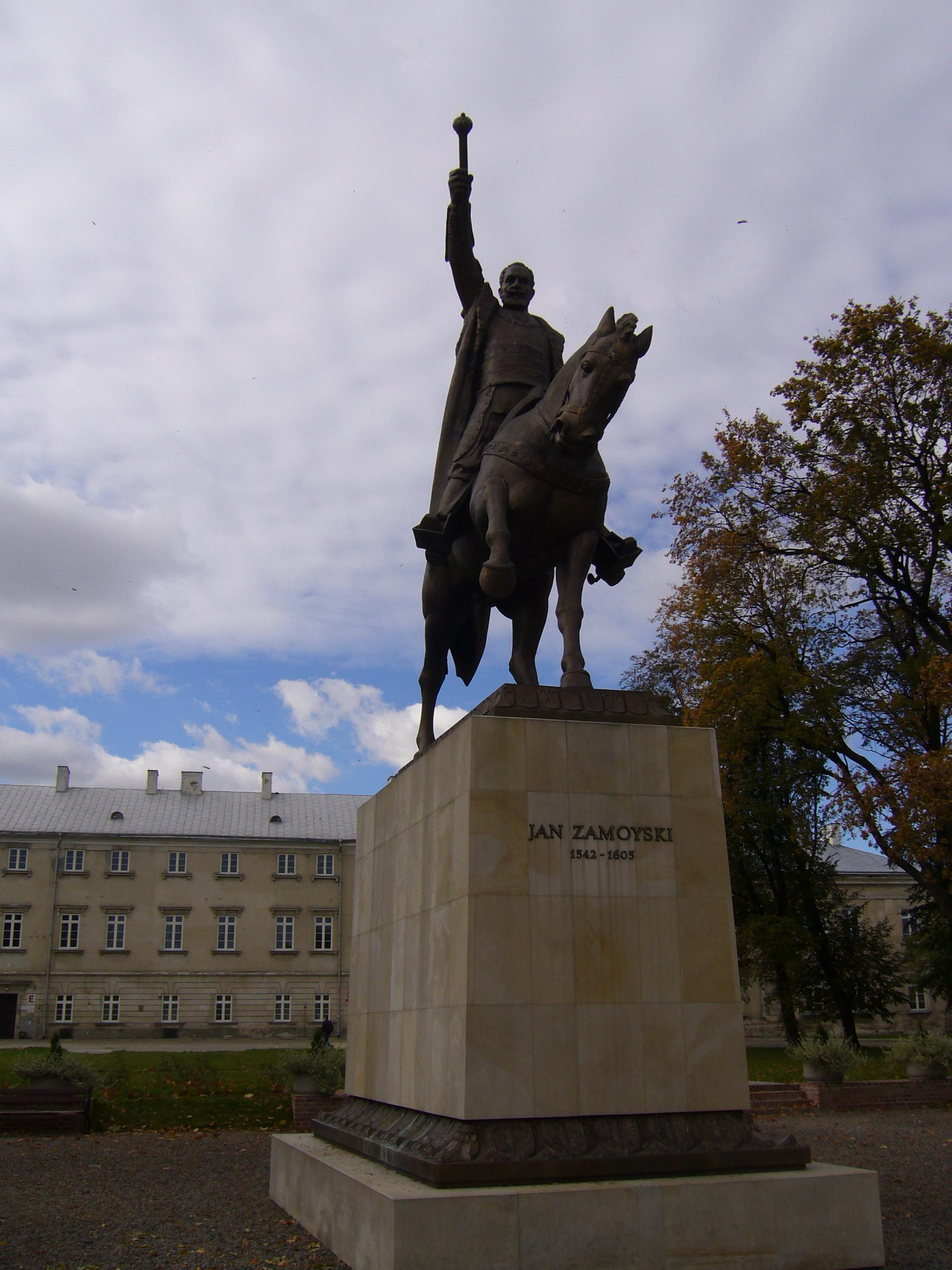
Statue of Execution movement supporter Chancellor Jan Zamoyski in Zamość

The Executionist movement was a 16th-century political movement in the Kingdom of Poland and, later, the Polish–Lithuanian Commonwealth. It was popular among lesser, middle and even some higher nobility, and it also enjoyed the support of the Polish king. In Polish, the movement is variously known as ruch egzekucyjny, egzekucja praw ("execution [enforcement] of the laws"), or egzekucja dóbr ("execution of property"). The movement sought the revendication of public and state lands which were illegally held by various magnates. The followers of the movement were known as popularyści ("popularists"), or zamoyszczycy ("Zamoyskites", after the main movement supporter Jan Zamoyski).

The movement opposed the abuse of the existing laws by the higher nobility (magnates), and demanded the "execution", or actual implementation, of already existing legislation.

Major supporters of the movement included:

- Chancellor Jan Zamoyski,
- Sejm marshal Mikołaj Sienicki,
- Sejm marshal Rafał Leszczyński (ancestor of King Stanisław Leszczyński, grandfather of Primate of Poland Wacław Leszczyński),
- Politicians like Hieronim Ossoliński, Jakub Ostroróg, Jan Ponętowski.
- Portions of the movement's program received the support of philosophers such as Andrzej Frycz Modrzewski and Jan Łaski or writers like Augustinus Rotundus.

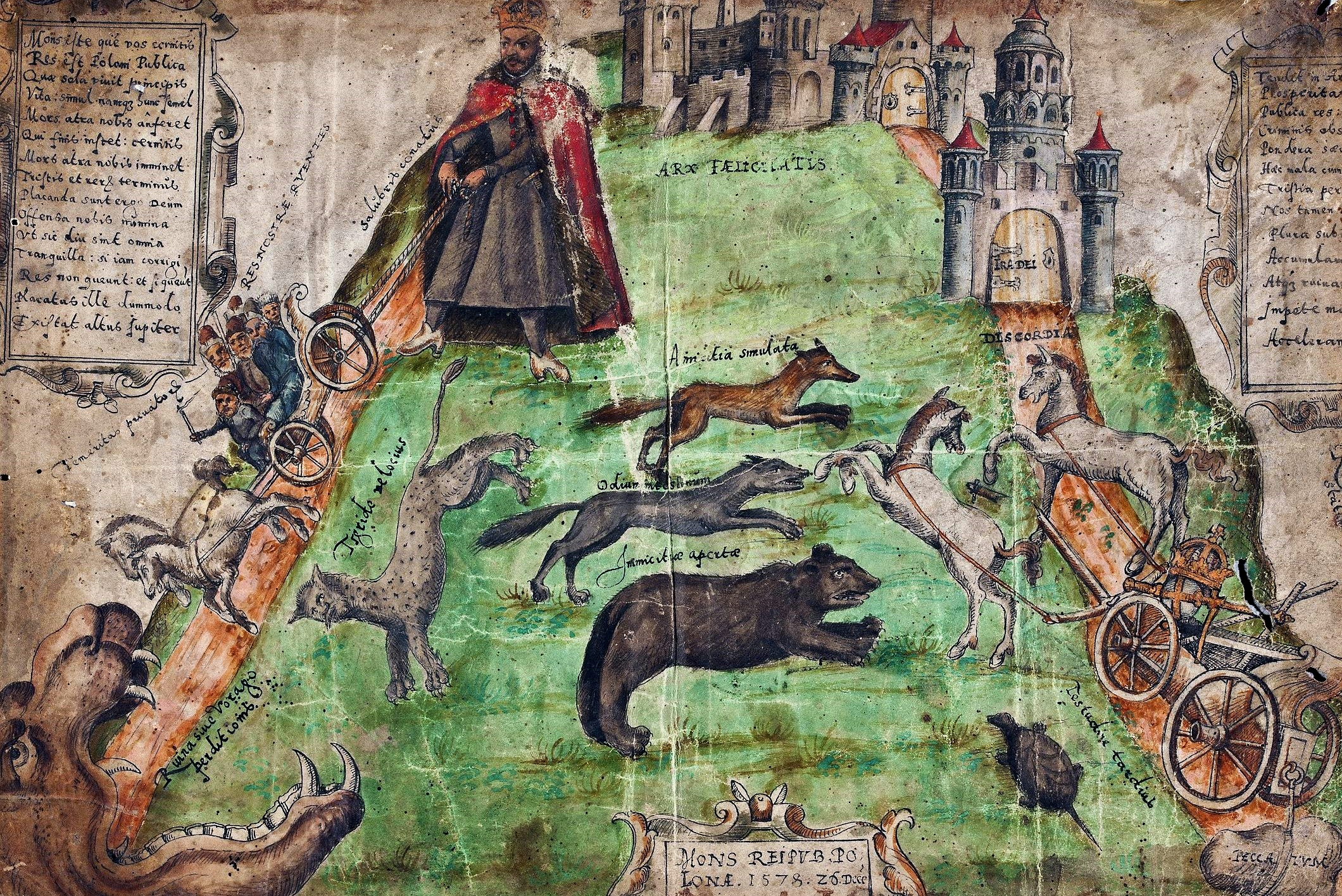
Mons Rei Publicae Polonae (Allegory of the state of the Commonwealth during the reign of Stephen Báthory), 1578, National Museum in Warsaw. The composition presents the vision of the Polish state standing by the King and the Church, in line with the popular lex-rex rule of the executionist movement.

The movement's goal was to reform the country, increase the rights of the lesser and middle nobility in parliament (Sejm) at the expense of the magnates, the priesthood and to a lesser extent, the monarch. The Executionist movement succeeded in having some of its demands implemented. However, by the early 17th century it declined and lost power before having attained most of its goals. The latter are largely viewed by modern historians as having been potentially salutary, had they been implemented.

The Execution movement's demands included:

- Respect for sejmik constitutions (legal acts), and codification of the laws (hence, "execution of the laws"),
- Return of crown lands ("królewszczyzny"), often illegally held by the magnates, to the king (hence, "execution of lands"),
- Increasing the power of the Sejm (parliament); thus, the law of "Nihil novi",
- Respect for the Incompatibilitas law of 1504, which specified that some offices of the Polish–Lithuanian Commonwealth cannot be held together at the same time by a single person.
- Respect for the rule of residence, which stipulated that certain district offices might be held only by a person who maintained a residence in a particular district (territory, county).

Additional demands and ideologies at various times also included:

- No new laws were to be passed without the approval of the Sejm.
- The executionists favored a strong central authority.
- In the view of the executionists the king was to represent the monarchy, the Senate the magnates and the Sejm the democracy of the nobility. Out of these three they saw the last one as the organ which should be made into the dominant power in the country.
- The removal of the privileges of the clergy. This included demands for the taxation of the church, the secularization of church lands, limitations on ecclesiastical jurisdiction in regard to disputes over the tithe or other economic matters and a review of donations made to the church. Payments
- They sought a tighter union with Lithuania, and an end to the autonomy of Prussia.
- A reform of the public finances.
- An organization of a standing army.
- An affirmation of religious freedom.
- Complete removal of tariffs on imports and limits on internal tolls.
- The liquidation of medieval guilds, a ban on land ownership by non-szlachta, greater economic freedom for Jews at the expanse of the burgers, including access to city and town markets, and a limit on church appointments of non-szlachta.
- A reform and modernization of the judicial system.

== See also ==
- Łaski's Statute
- Patriotic Party
- Zebrzydowski Rebellion
