= Józef =

Józef is a Polish variant of the masculine given name Joseph.

== Art ==
- Józef Chełmoński (1849–1914), Polish painter
- Józef Czapski (1896–1993), Polish artist, author, and critic
- Józef Gosławski (1908–1963), Polish sculptor

== Clergy ==
- Józef Glemp (1929–2013), Polish cardinal
- Józef Kowalczyk (1938–2025), Polish prelate, canon lawyer and diplomat
- Józef Kowalski (priest) (1911–1942), Polish priest
- Józef Michalik (1941–2026), Polish archbishop
- Józef Milik (1922–2006), Polish priest and biblical scholar
- Józef Tischner (1931–2000), Polish priest
- Józef Andrzej Załuski (1702–1774), Polish priest and Bishop of Kyiv
- Józef Życiński (1948–2011), Polish archbishop

== Literature ==
- Józef Maksymilian Ossoliński (1748–1826), Polish novelist and poet
- Józef Wybicki (1747–1822), Polish poet

== Military ==
- Józef Bem (1794–1850), Polish general and engineer
- Józef Biss (1913–1977), Polish military officer
- Józef Grzesiak (1900–1975), Polish resistance member and scoutmaster
- Józef Haller (1873–1960), Polish general
- Józef Piotrowski (1840–1923), Polish participant in the January Uprising
- Józef Poniatowski (1763–1813), Polish general
- Józef Sowiński (1777–1831), Polish general
- Józef Zając (1891–1963), Polish general and pilot

== Politics ==
- Józef Piotr Klim (born 1960), Polish politician
- Józef Kajetan Ossoliński (1758–1834), Polish castellan
- Józef Kanty Ossoliński (1707–1780), Polish magnate
- Józef Piłsudski (1867–1935), Polish chief of state

== Science ==
- Józef Gosławski (1865–1904), Polish architect
- Józef Marcinkiewicz (1910–1940), Polish mathematician
- Józef Płoszko (1867–1931), Polish architect
- Józef Przytycki (born 1953), Polish mathematician
- Józef Rostafiński (1850–1928), Polish botanist
- Józef Zawadzki (chemist) (1886–1951), Polish physical chemist

== Sport ==
- Józef Gąsienica-Sobczak (born 1934), Polish skier
- Józef Grzesiak (boxer) (1941–2020), Polish boxer
- Józef Młynarczyk (born 1953), Polish footballer and coach
- Józef Stefański (1908–1997), Polish cyclist
- Józef Szmidt (1935–2024), Polish triple jumper
- Józef Zapędzki (1929–2022), Polish sport shooter

== Television and film ==
- Józef Kostecki (1922–1980), Polish actor

== Other fields ==
- Józef Zawadzki (publisher) (1781–1838), Polish publisher

== See also ==
- Polish names
- Jozef
