= Józef Potocki (starost of Leżajsk) =

Polish nobleman (1734/35–1802)

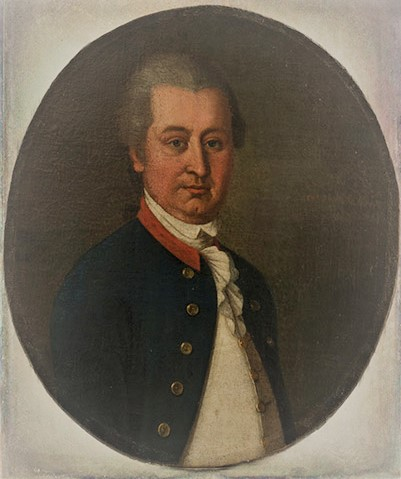
- Coat of arms: Piława
- Born: 1734 or 1735
- Died: 12 December 1802 (aged 67–68); Vienna, Austria
- Noble family: Potocki
- Spouse: Anna Teresa Ossolińska
- Father: Stanisław Potocki
- Mother: Helena Zamoyska

Józef Potocki (Polish pronunciation: [pɔˈtɔt͡skʲi], 1734/35–1802) was a Polish nobleman (szlachcic).

Józef was Great Krajczy of the Crown from 1767 to 1780, Rotmistrz of a Husar Choragiew, starost of Leżajsk and Knight of the Order of the White Eagle, awarded in 1769.

He was married to Anna Teresa Ossolińska and they had three children together: Jan Potocki, Seweryn Potocki and Maria Anna Potocka.
