= Józef Kajetan Ossoliński =

Polish noble (1758–1834)

- Count
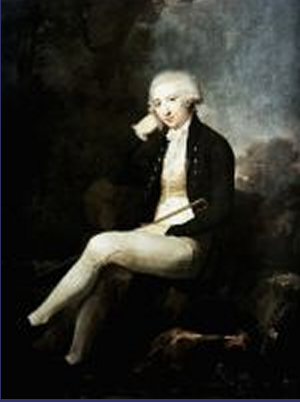
- Józef Kajetan Ossoliński
- Coat of arms: Topór
- Full name: Józef Kajetan Ossoliński
- Born: 1758
- Died: 1834 (aged 75–76)
- Family: Ossoliński
- Consort: Maria Barbara Zalewska
- Issue: Konstancja Ossolińska; Wiktor Maksymilian Ossoliński
- Father: Aleksander Ossoliński
- Mother: Benedykta Antonina Loewendal

Count Józef Kajetan Ossoliński (1758–15 April 1834) was a notable Polish szlachcic (nobleman) with a distinguished political career. He served as the Castellan of the Podlaskie Voivodeship from 1790 and was a Senator Castellan of the Kingdom of Poland from 1822 to 1824. Additionally, he held the position of Starost of Sandomierz starting in 1781. Ossoliński was active in politics throughout his life, participating as a representative from the Drohiczyn region in various parliamentary sessions, including the Four-Year Sejm and the Targowica Confederation.

Ossoliński was born into a prominent family; his father, Aleksander Maciej Ossoliński, was a notable court official. Over his lifetime, he was married twice and had three children, including a daughter and a son who continued the family legacy.

He also gained recognition as a collector of art, creating a gallery in his palace in Warsaw, which housed works acquired from King Stanisław August Poniatowski.
