= Jan Zbigniew Ossoliński =

Polish–Lithuanian nobleman (1555–1623)

- Coat of arms: Topór
- Born: 3 September 1555
- Died: 3 October 1623 (aged 68)
- Family: Ossoliński
- Consort: Jadwiga Sienieńska; Anna Firlej; Katarzyna Kosińska; Katarzyna Warszewiecka
- Issue: by Jadwiga Sienieńska: Krzysztof Ossoliński; Maksymilian Ossoliński; Elżbieta Ossolińska by Anna Firlej: Jerzy Ossoliński
- Father: Hieronim Ossoliński
- Mother: Katarzyna Zborowska

Jan Zbigniew Ossoliński (3 September 1555 – 3 October 1623) was a Polish–Lithuanian nobleman, or szlachcic.

He held the following offices:

- Secretary to the King from 1578
- Chamberlain or podkomorzy of Sandomierz from 1593
- Castellan of Małogoszcz and Żarnów from 1603
- Voivode of the Podlasie Voivodeship from 1605
- Voivode of the Sandomierz Voivodeship from 1613
- Elder or starost of Czersk, Nowe Miasto, and Stopnica.

Ossoliński was the son of Hieronim Ossoliński, and the father of Jerzy Ossoliński, who was to become Kanclerz (Chancellor) of the Polish–Lithuanian Commonwealth.
