= Anna Teresa Potocka =

Polish noblewoman and philanthropist (1746–1810)

Anna Teresa Ossolińska
- Princess Ossolińska
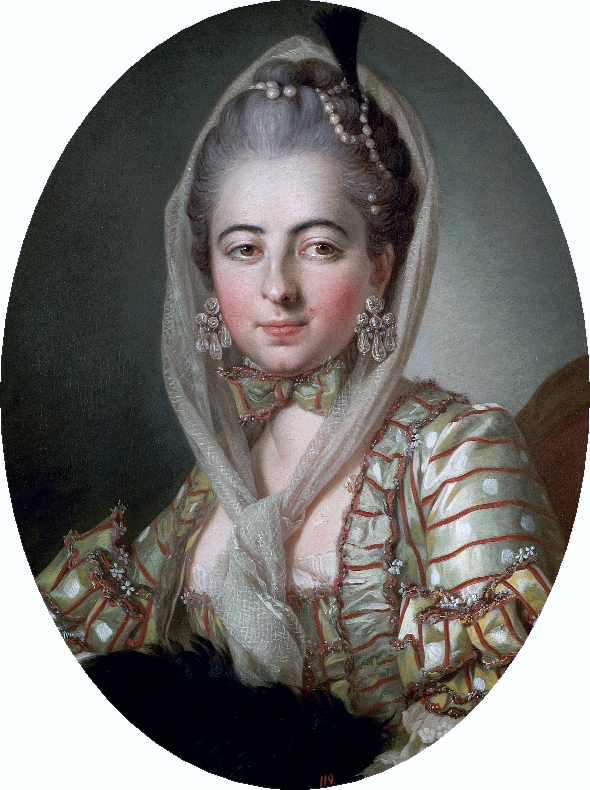
- Coat of arms: Topór
- Full name: Anna Teresa Ossolińska
- Born: 1746
- Died: 1810 (aged 63–64)
- Family: Ossoliński
- Spouse: Józef Potocki
- Issue: Jan Potocki; Seweryn Potocki; Maria Anna Potocka
- Father: Józef Ossoliński
- Mother: Teresa Stadnicka

Princess Anna Teresa Potocka née Ossolińska (1746–1810) was a Polish noblewoman, philanthropist and Freemason.

== Life ==
She was the daughter of Józef Ossoliński and Teresa Stadnicka and the sister of Józef Salezy Ossoliński. She married Józef Potocki in December 1760, and became the mother of the writer Jan Potocki.

She was a supporter of the Bar Confederation (1768–1771). She was known for her philanthropic work and founded a charitable society. When a Woman's Adoption Lodge of the Masonic Order was founded in Poland in 1769, she became its Grand Mistress, counting other noblewomen such as Elżbieta Czartoryska (1736–1816) among its members. She is known as the founder of the church at Rymanów.

The year of her death is usually given as 1810, but she was still alive in 1812 when the second wife of Jean, Constance, visited her in Vienna.
