= Krzysztof Ossoliński =

Polish–Lithuanian nobleman (1587–1645)

- Coat of arms: Topór
- Born: April 28, 1587; Bukowsko, Poland
- Died: February 24, 1645 (aged 57); Kraków, Poland
- Noble family: Ossoliński
- Spouses: Zofia Cikowska; Zofia Krasińska; Elżbieta Firlej
- Issue: Krzysztof Baldwin Ossoliński
- Father: Jan Zbigniew Ossoliński
- Mother: Jadwiga Sienieńska

Krzysztof Ossoliński (28 April 1587 – 24 February 1645) was a Polish–Lithuanian nobleman (szlachcic).

He was podstoli of Sandomierz since 1618, podkomorzy of Sandomierz since 1619, castellan sadecki in 1633, wojnicki in 1636, voivode of Sandomierz Voivodeship in 1638, starost stobnicki, ropczycki and wolbromski.

He was the brother of kanclerz (chancellor) Jerzy Ossoliński and an important figure in the contemporary politics of the Polish–Lithuanian Commonwealth.

He was the founder of Krzyżtopór, a Baroque castle that was reduced to ruin during the Swedish invasion of 1655.
