= Ossolin, Świętokrzyskie Voivodeship =

Ossolin
- Village
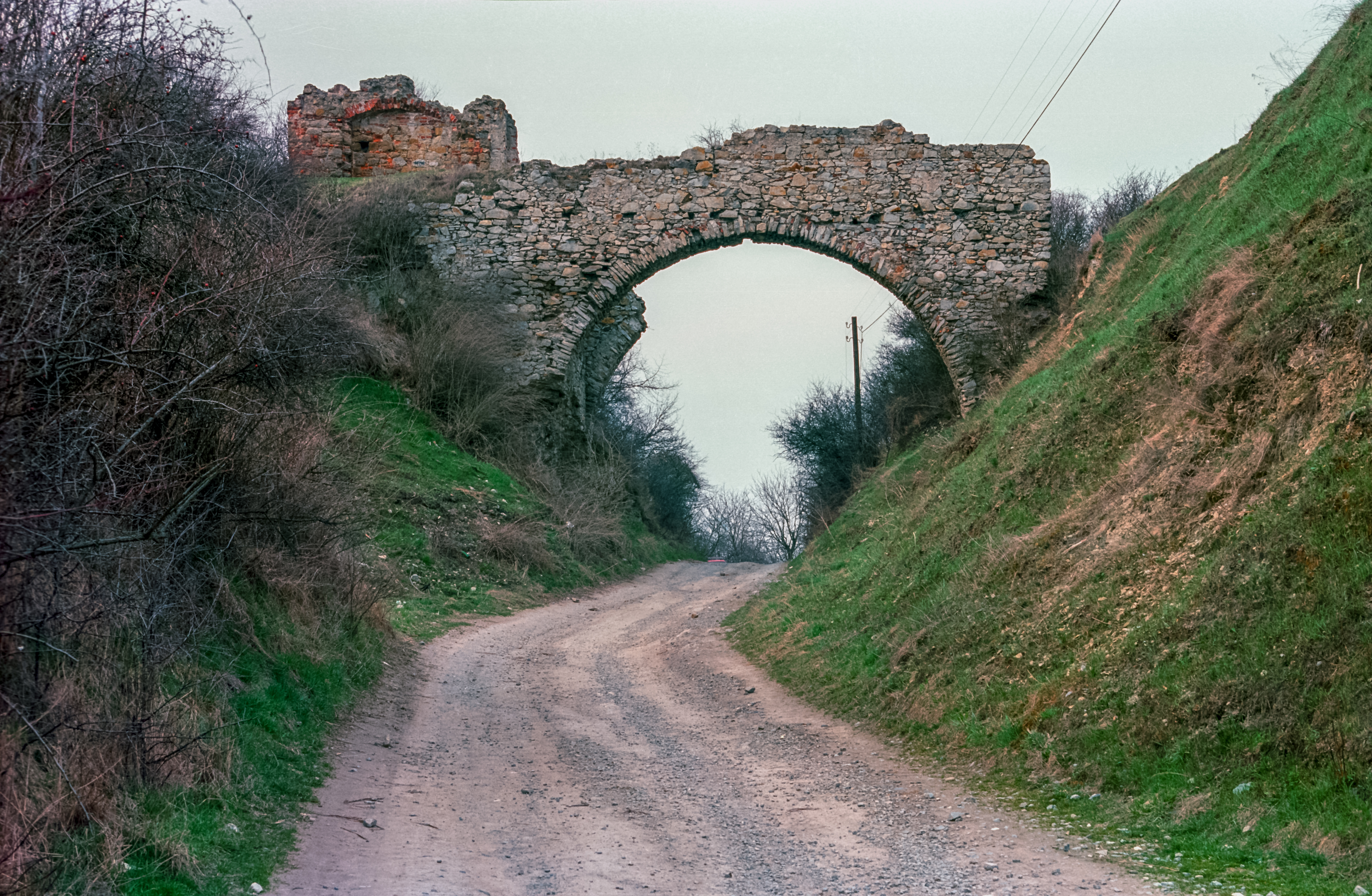
- Castle ruins

- Location within Poland
- Coordinates: 50°40′26″N 21°30′24″E
- Country: Poland
- Voivodeship: Świętokrzyskie
- County: Sandomierz
- Gmina: Klimontów
- Population: 180

Ossolin [ɔsˈsɔlin] is a village in the administrative district of Gmina Klimontów, within Sandomierz County, Świętokrzyskie Voivodeship, in south-central Poland. It lies approximately 5 km (3 mi) north-east of Klimontów, 18 km (11 mi) west of Sandomierz, and 67 km (42 mi) east of the regional capital Kielce.

== See also ==
- The Lesser Polish Way
