= Feliks Zamoyski =

- Coat of arms: Jelita
- Born: 15th century
- Died: 1535
- Family: Zamoyski
- Consort: (?) Smoczek; Anna Uhrowiecka
- Issue: with Anna Uhrowiecka; Florian Zamoyski; Stanisław Zamoyski
- Father: Florian Zamoyski
- Mother: Anna Komorowska

Feliks Zamoyski (died 1535) was a Polish nobleman (szlachcic).

He became the Wojski of Bełz Voivodeship in 1514, the Łowczy of Chełm Land in 1517, and the Wojski of Chełm, Tax collector (poborca) of Chełm and Belz in 1524. He also became the District Writer of Chełm in 1525 and the Podkomorzy of Chełm.

In 1517 Feliks and his brother Mikołaj received a payment of debt in the amount of 1,000 florins from Jan Ostrowski, a wealthy landowner from what is now known as Skoków. Zamoyski used a portion of the collection to fund the building of a fortified castle which was used in a 1529 battle to repel an invasion by the Crimean Tatars. His grandson, Jan Zamoyski, founded the city of Zamość upon the small village that blossomed around the family manor in 1580 and became its first ordynat.
