= Czołem Wielkiej Polsce =

Polish associated with political and cultural movements

Czołem Wielkiej Polsce (English: Salute to Great Poland) is a slogan that has been associated with various political and cultural movements in Poland. It has gained prominence in recent years, particularly during public gatherings and events commemorating Poland's independence.

== Historical background ==
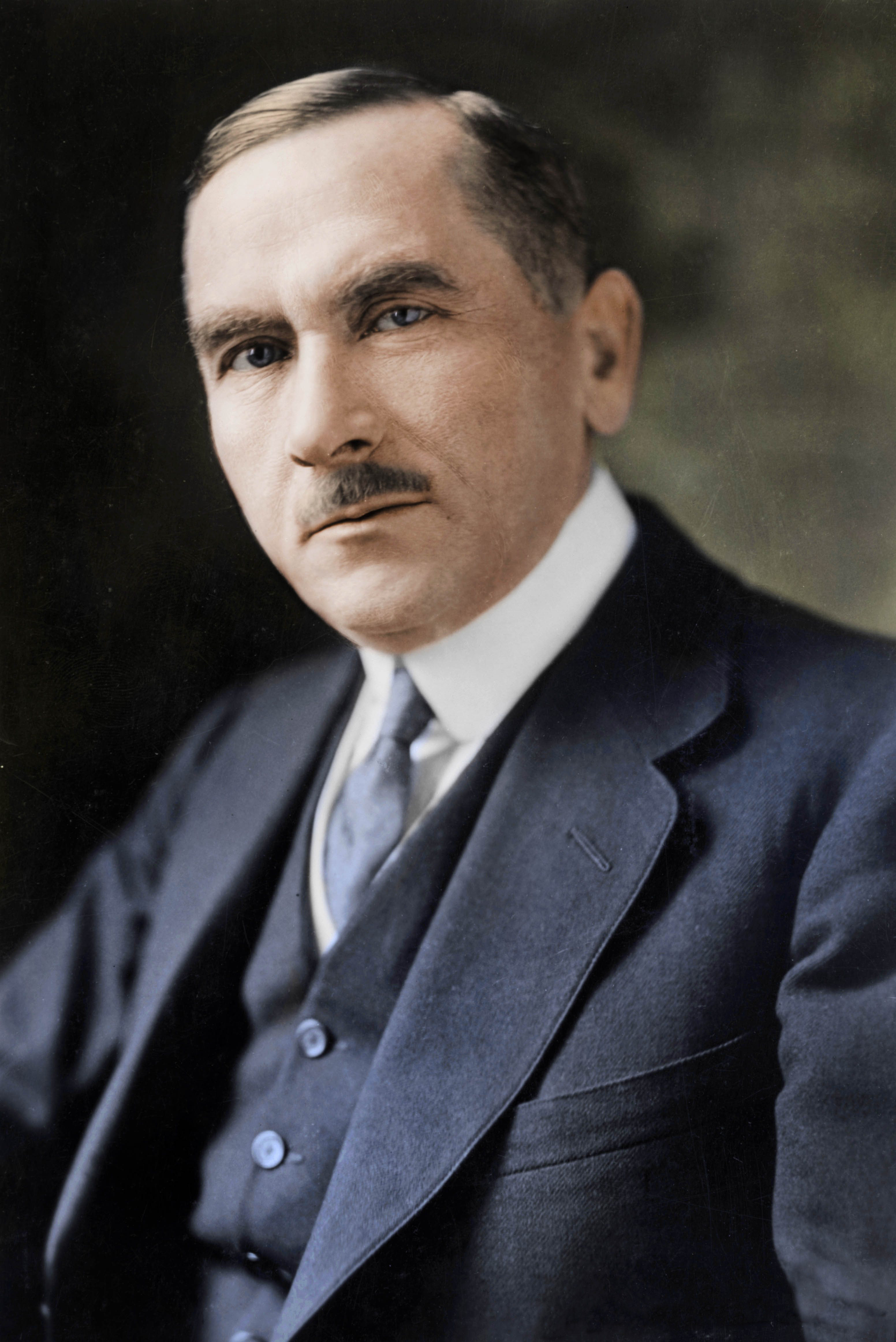
Roman Dmowski: Prominent Polish leader, one of the founding fathers of the Second Polish Republic.

The slogan Czołem Wielkiej Polsce has historical roots dating back to Poland's complex history of independence and national identity. It is derived from the Polish word czołem, which can be translated as hail or salute, and Wielka Polska, meaning Great Poland. The use of such slogans has been a recurring motif in Polish history during moments of patriotic fervor and national pride.

The usage of Czołem Wielkiej Polsce has been closely linked to various political and ideological movements. Notably, it has been associated initially with the Camp of Great Poland of Roman Dmowski and later the National Radical Camp (ONR).

The slogan has been prominently featured during Poland's annual Independence Day celebrations on November 11th. This date marks the anniversary of Poland regaining its sovereignty in 1918, more than a century after it was Partitions of Poland.

== Controversy ==
The use of Czołem Wielkiej Polsce and its association with far-right and ultranationalist movements have generated controversy both within Poland and internationally. Critics argue that the slogan is indicative of a growing far-right presence in the country and raises concerns about rising nationalism and xenophobia.

Hail Great Poland! I speak here primarily as one of the veterans of the Independence March, as one of the founders of the Independence March Association. It's been fourteen years already. In the sad time after the Smolensk disaster, we gathered for the first time. We broke the malaise, we broke the sadness, we went out together onto the streets and walked despite the fact that the extreme left, which clowned around in Auschwitz prison uniforms, tried to stop us!

Today, they play the role of political leaders, and we do what Polish patriots do. Here, in Warsaw, or in their cities. We celebrate independence! We celebrate that Poland is a free country!

The Independence March from the beginning has gone under one main slogan: God, Honor, Fatherland. These are slogans that in one of the popular commercial TV station were described as fascist. These are Polish slogans! These are traditional slogans! These are slogans that we will never be ashamed of: God, Honor, and Fatherland!

— Krzysztof Bosak, 2023

In an incident in 2018, hundreds of supporters of the ONR and members of All-Polish Youth participated in a pilgrimage to Jasna Góra. They marched with burning torches and shouted slogans including Hail Great Poland, God, Honour, Fatherland, and Youth, Faith, Nationalism.

== See also ==
- God, Honour, Fatherland
- "Poland Is Not Yet Lost"
- For our freedom and yours
- Pro Fide, Lege et Rege
- "Long Live Belarus!"
