= Stolnik =

Type of Eastern European court office

Stolnik (Lithuanian: stalininkas, Polish: stolnik, Ukrainian: стольник, Russian: сто́льник, IPA: [ˈstolʲnʲɪk]) was a court office in Lithuania, Poland, Ukraine and Russia, responsible for serving the royal table, then an honorary court title and a district office. It approximately corresponds to English term "pantler".

== Stolnik in Crown of Poland ==
In the Crown of Poland under the first Piast dukes and kings, this was a court office.

From the 14th century, it was an honorary court title in the Kingdom of Poland, since the 16th century.

- Grand Stolnik of the Crown (Polish: Stolnik wielki koronny)
- Stolnik of the Crown (Polish: Stolnik koronny)
- Court Stolnik of the Crown (Polish: Stolnik nadworny koronny)

According to the 1768 district office hierarchy, the Stolnik's position in the Crown of Poland was superior to that of Deputy cup-bearer and inferior to that of district judge.

== Stolnik in the Grand Duchy of Lithuania ==
In Lithuania, the Stolnik's position emerged in the late 15th century, comparatively later than Marshal, Treasurer, and Cup-bearer, with the first Grand Stolnik of Lithuania, Albertas Jonaitis Manvydas, being known from 1475. Initially, the Stolnik took care of the Grand Duke's food warehouses, distribution of food, his manor's parks, gardens, ponds, and villages assigned to the estates. However, in the late 16th century, the position became purely ceremonial and the individual was charged with serving the Grand Duke at the table only during feasts. It was the sons of Lithuanian nobility that began their service in the ruler's court who were assigned the role of the Stolnik . Between the 16th and 18th centuries, the Stolnik came from various families such as Alšėniškiai, Kęsgaila, Dorohostaiskiai, Hlebavičiai, Chodkiewicz, Radziwiłł, Sapieha and others. Stanisław August Poniatowski was the Stolnik of Lithuania from 1755 to 1764, while the last one from 1764 to 1795 was Józef Klemens Czartoryski.

There were two types of Stolnik in Lithuania:

- Grand Stolnik of Lithuania (Lithuanian: Lietuvos didysis stalininkas; Polish: Stolnik wielki litewski)
- Stolnik of Lithuania (Lithuanian: Lietuvos stalininkas; Polish: Stolnik litewski)

According to the 1768 district office hierarchy of the Grand Duchy of Lithuania, the Stolnik was superior to podstoli and inferior to wojski.

== Stolnik in Russia ==
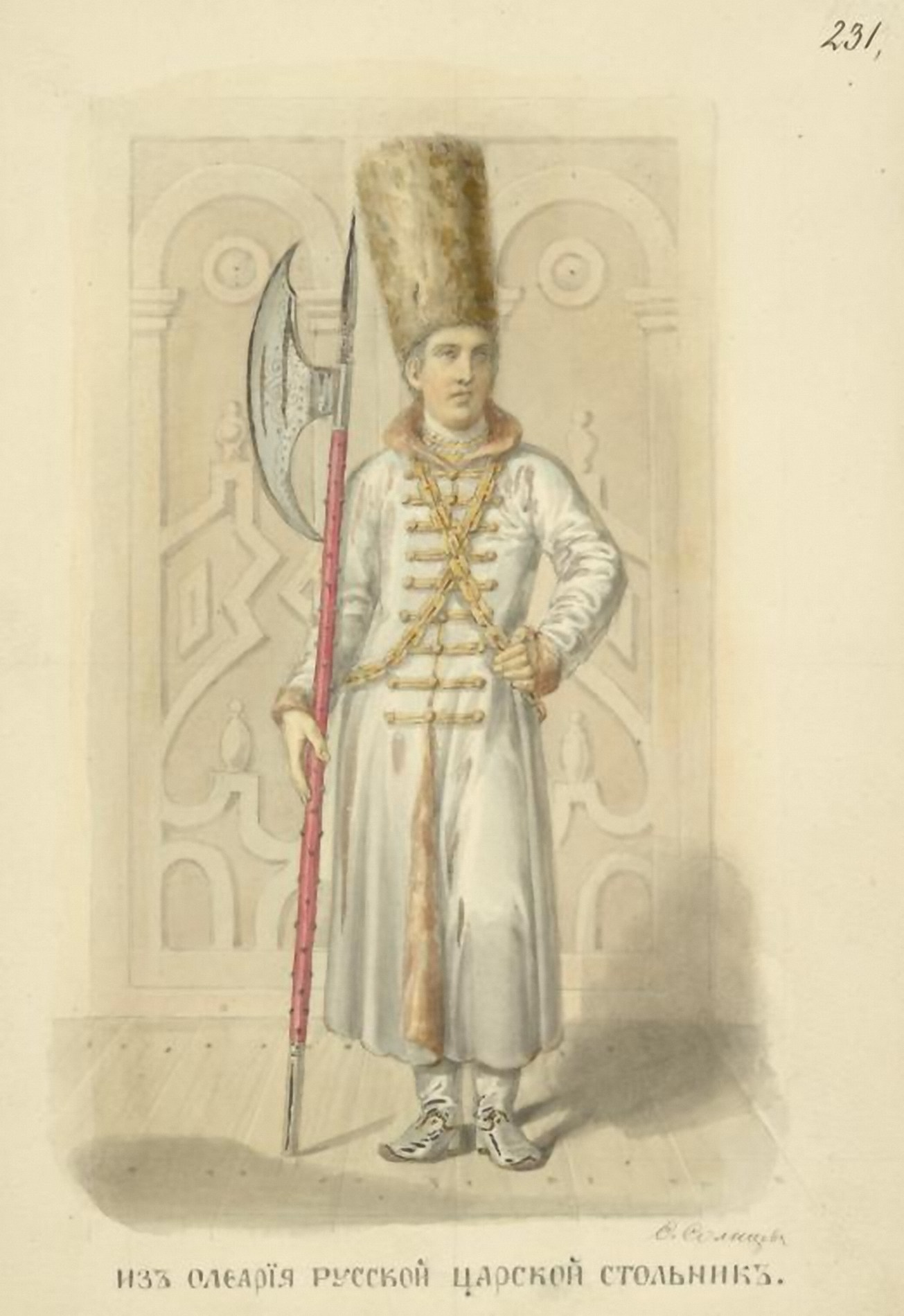
An illustration of a Russian royal stolnik in the book of Fyodor Solntsev, 1869 based on that of Adam Olearius

Stolniks were known as palace servants of the Russian rulers since the 13th century. They were also called chashniks, literally "cup-bearers". In the 16th and 17th centuries they were young nobles who brought dishes to the tsar's table, looked after his bedroom, and accompanied him in travels. Those who served tsar in his apartments called room or close stolniks (ближние, комнатные стольники).

Stolniks could simultaneously serve in the foreign office or in the army. They were ranked fifth in the hierarchy of Russian bureaucracy, after boyars, okolnichys, duma nobles, and duma dyaks.

Stolniks were also attached to episcopal administrations as were other similar offices also found in the grand princely or tsarist administration. For example, stolniks are found in documents from the archiepiscopal records in Veliky Novgorod.

== See also ==
- Offices in the Polish–Lithuanian Commonwealth
- Russian rank titles during the sixteenth and seventeenth centuries
- Stavilac
