= Franciszek Grocholski =

- Coat of arms: Syrokomla
- Born: 2 November 1730; Woronowica
- Died: 11 November 1792 (aged 62); Tereszki
- Family: Grocholski
- Consort: Helena Lesznicka
- Issue: Tekla Grocholska; Julia Grocholska; Antoni Grocholski; Jan Nepomucen Grocholski
- Father: Michał Grocholski
- Mother: Agnieszka Radzymińska

Franciszek Grocholski (2 November 1730 – 11 November 1792) was a Polish nobleman (szlachcic).

Franciszek became Podstoli of Braclaw since 1761, Borough Writer of Krzemieniec since 1764, Chamberlain of King Stanisław August Poniatowski since 1767, Podczaszy of Braclaw since 1771, Chorąży of Winnica since 1772, Chorąży of Braclaw since 1774, Great Miecznik of the Crown since 1775, Bracław Voivodeship deputy for the Great Sejm.

Konsyliarz of the Targowica Confederation.

== Awards ==
- Knight of the Order of Saint Stanislaus, awarded in 1776.
- Knight of the Order of the White Eagle, awarded in 1778.
