= Offices in the Polish–Lithuanian Commonwealth =

Organizational and administrative structure of the Polish–Lithuanian Commonwealth

This article discusses the organizational and administrative structure of the Polish–Lithuanian Commonwealth.

The Polish–Lithuanian Commonwealth was a confederative mixed monarchy of the period 1569–1795, comprising the Kingdom of Poland, the Grand Duchy of Lithuania and their fiefs. The Commonwealth was governed by the Parliament (Sejm) consisting of the King, the King-appointed Senate (Voivodes, Castellans, Ministers, Bishops) and the rest of hereditary nobility either in person or through the Sejm proper (consisting of deputies representing their lands). The nobility's constitutional domination of the state made the King very weak and the commoners (burgesses and peasants) almost entirely unrepresented in the Commonwealth's political system.

== Central offices ==
=== State offices ===
The division between public and court offices in the realities of the Polish-Lithuanian Commonwealth is unclear, as all central offices originated from court positions. Some of them gained full autonomy, while others continued to perform service functions for the ruler. The state and court hierarchies overlapped, and the officials' competencies were not clearly defined. After 1565, the principle of "incompatibilitas" ("incompatibility") forbade Voivodes and Castellans to hold a second title as a Minister, except for the post of Hetman.

The system of offices in the Commonwealth was the result of equalizing the administrative hierarchies of both constituent parts of the state: the Crown of the Kingdom of Poland and the Grand Duchy of Lithuania. Lithuania had its own separate court tradition, but after drawing closer to Poland at the end of the 14th century, there was a trend of copying Polish models and creating offices analogous to those existing in Poland. This process culminated in the acts of the Union of Lublin, but it continued in practice until the 18th century as part of the so-called coequation of laws. However, the direction of influence was sometimes reversed, such as in the case of the office of the court huntsman, which appeared in Poland later than in Lithuania.

Essentially, almost every central office was dual, one for Poland and the other for Lithuania. This was reflected in the title, to which an appropriate adjective was added: Crown or Lithuanian. Thus, in the Commonwealth, there were two Grand Marshals: the Crown Grand Marshal and the Lithuanian Grand Marshal.

State offices
English name	Polish name	In Poland since	In Lithuania since	Function	Notes
Ministers (senatorial)
Grand Marshal	Marszałek wielki	1355	c. 1407	Taking care of the king's security and the peace and quiet in his place of residence (marshal court). Being master of royal ceremonies, managing the court and access to the sovereign. Organising and presiding over the proceedings of the senate, security of the sessions of the parliament (marshal's articles), organising the election of the sovereign.	
Court Marshal	Marszałek nadworny	1409	c. 1494	Aide and alternate to the Grand Marshal, he acted independently only in his absence.	Also a court office. In Lithuania, there was a separate office of Court (Hospodar) Marshal in the 15th-16th century, which over time lost its importance and became a land office.
Grand Chancellor	Kanclerz wielki	10-11th c.	1441	Heading the greater chancellery. Directing the external policy of the state. Guarding the observance of rights. Announcement of new resolutions and laws. Presiding over the assessor court.	In the Crown, the office was alternately held by a lay person and a cleric.
Vice-chancellor	Podkanclerzy	1189	1566	Aide and alternate to the Grand Chancellor, headed the lesser chancellery.	
Treasurer	Podskarbi	13th c.	1429	Managing the state's finances, issuing money, guarding the royal crown (until the 17th century).	In Lithuania, held in conjunction with the office of Grand Scribe.
Ministers (non-senatorial)
Court Treasurer	Podskarbi nadworny	c. 1454	c. 1476	Aide and alternate to the Treasurer. Its sole function was to manage the king's property and income.	Also a court office. Since 1775 senatorial.
Grand Hetman	Hetman wielki	circa 1485	circa 1499	Command of the enlisted army, administration of army finances, judicial powers over the army. Hetman issued administrative and judicial regulations for the army (Hetman's Articles). Limited right to conduct foreign policy.	Appointed only during the Sejm. Since 1768 senatorial. In 1717 the power of the hetmans was limited. Also a military office.
Field Hetman	Hetman polny	1492	circa 1520	Aide and alternate to the Grand Hetman. Originally in Poland the commander of the Obrona potoczna, until the early 17th century appointed on an ad hoc basis.	Appointed only during the Sejm. Since 1768 senatorial. In 1717 the power of the hetmans was limited. Also a military office.
Other non-senatorial state offices
Grand Secretary	Sekretarz wielki	1504	1670	Chancellor-like functions, without the right to sign and seal letters. In addition, sitting on the assessor court.	An office held by a clergyman, the separate office of lay Grand Secretary was created in 1764.
–	Referendarz	c. 1510	c. 1539	Receiving requests and complaints from private individuals and referring them to the King and Chancellors. Sitting in assessor, report and Sejm's courts.	Two, a layman and a clergyman.
Instigator	Instygator	1586	1586	Public prosecutor	Two, four since 1775.
Vice-instigator	Wiceinstygator		c. 1615	Alternate to the Instigators.	Abolished in 1775.
Grand Scribe	Pisarz wielki	1504	1504	Preparation of resolutions and documents. Sitting in assessor court, drafting sentences therein.	One in the Crown, four in Lithuania, since 1764 four each.
–	Kustosz koronny/Skarbny	before 16th c.	1452	The Crown Custodian guarded the royal jewels at Krakow Castle, the Skarbny guarded the treasury at Vilnius Castle.	In Poland, it rose to prominence after the court was moved to Warsaw.

Both the Chancellor and the Sub-Chancellor stood at the head of the chancelleries (‘greater’ and ‘lesser’), which were headed by Regents. Each chancellery employed a number of professionals: secretaries, scribes and clerks. Outside the chancellery were the Metricants, in charge of keeping the Metrics, i.e. the books in which all the documents arriving and departing from each chancellery were entered. There were four chancelleries, four Metricants and two Metrics (Crown and Lithuanian) in the whole of the Commonwealth. The Treasurers were also supported by a number of professional officials, the most important of whom were Treasury Scribes (two in the Crown, three in Lithuania). He was assisted in matters of coinage issuance by a Mincer. In addition, a number of other functionaries: dispensers, superintendents, tax collectors, customs officers and toll collectors.

=== Court offices ===
Originally, all central offices were simultaneously court offices. However, in the Kingdom of Poland, the concept of the Crown, representing the state itself, was distinguished relatively early from the person of the mortal monarch. Consequently, some offices lost their direct association with the monarch and his court, becoming state offices primarily responsible for state administration. This division was never complete, but there was a group of offices whose roles were essentially limited to serving the court and the monarch. Among them, we distinguish between offices of the court (Polish: urzędy dworu) and the court offices (Polish: urzędy nadworne). The court offices attended to the king's service, while the offices of the court managed and administered the court as an institution. The court offices were further divided into the offices of the royal table and the representatives of royal majesty.

Most of these offices were of a purely honorary nature, their holders did not perform the functions associated with them, or if they did, they did so very rarely, mainly during rare grand royal ceremonies (coronations, weddings, homages etc.). Apart from the aforementioned offices, the court included a significantly larger group of people, both honorary courtiers and servants.

Court offices
English name	Polish name	Date of creation		Function	Notes
English name	Polish name	Poland	Lithuania	Function	Notes
Court offices of the royal table
Kitchen-master	Kuchmistrz	c. 1352	c. 1409	Managing the royal kitchen.	
Stolnik	Stolnik	c. 1450	c. 1501	Setting the royal table, directing the serving of food.	Disappeared in Poland in 1505, reappeared in 1633.
Vice-cupbearer	Podczaszy	c. 1381	c. 1410	Serving liquor to the king.	Initially subordinate to the Cup-bearer, later equal in rank, higher in hierarchy
Carver	Krajczy	c. 1412	c. 1446	Cutting and serving food to the king.	
Podstoli	Podstoli	c. 1442	c. 1470	Carrying ceremonial staff in front of the Stolnik.	
Cupbearer	Cześnik	13th c.	1409	Pouring liquor into goblets.	
Court offices of the royal majesty
Grand Ensign	Chorąży wielki	before 13th c.	1499	Carrying the royal banner during the ceremonies	
Court Ensign	Chorąży nadworny	1646	1501	Alternate to the	
Swordbearer	Miecznik	c. 1327	c. 1496	Carrying the royal sword during the ceremonies	
Equerry	Koniuszy	c. 1507	c. 1510	Administration of the royal stables	In Lithuania initially, his role was fulfilled by Koniuszy of Vilnius. State office since the 17th century
Vice-equerry	Podkoniuszy	17th c.	c. 1617		
Grand Huntmaster	Łowczy wielki	c. 1576		Administration of the royal forests and organization of hunts	Honorary title since the 16th c.
Court Huntmaster	Łowczy nadworny	17th c.	c. 1596		
	Wojski		c. 1733		Appeared in the 18th century in Lithuania as a dignitary.
Offices of the court
	Podkomorzy	c. 1408	c. 1428	Actual management of the court, above all in the absence of the court marshal. Constantly stayed at the King's side.	
	Oboźny	c. 1511		Management of royal camp during the warfare.	Different than the military office of the same name.
	Woźniczy			Management of royal carriages.	
	Piwniczy	–	c. 1526	Management of the ruler's cellars.	
	Spiżarny	–	c. 1526	Management of the ruler's pantry.	Disappeared in early 17th c.

=== Military offices ===
The highest military officials were the Hetmans, they could not be removed. Until the beginning of the 18th century, hetmans were not paid for their services. With the emergence of a standing army in the Crown in the early 16th century and the office of Hetman, a staff of military officials formed around him to assist him in his tasks. The most important among them was the Field Scribe, closely followed by the Grand Warden. Over time, the offices began to lose their professional character and became purely dignitaries, the earliest of which was the office of the Grand Oboźny, whose tasks were actually carried out by the Field Oboźny. Other offices were still truly military in the 17th century, only becoming solely dignitaries in the 18th century. The following list covers only military offices, apart from these there were a number of other posts which were not dignitaries and were usually filled by professionals, there was also a separate cadre of officers.

Military offices
English name	Polish name	Date of creation		Function	Notes
English name	Polish name	Poland	Lithuania	Function	Notes
Grand Warden	Strażnik wielki	c. 1526	1635	Insuring the army on the march, commanding the vanguard when the army was commanded by the king.	In Poland originally with the title of Field Warden, from the 17th century of Grand Warden.
Field Warden	Strażnik polny	17th c.	c. 1624	Vigilance over the security of the country's eastern borders.	In Poland, appointed by the Hetman.
	Pisarz polny	c. 1509		Conducting military administration, surveying and recording troops, inspecting strongholds in Podolia and Ukraine.	
	Oboźny wielki			Establishment and administration of a military camp.	
	Oboźny polny			Establishment and administration of a military camp.	
	Generał artylerii			Reporting to the hetman, he was in charge of the administration of the artillery, armouries, arsenals and gun foundries.	
	Gernerał inspektor			Inspection of all regiments.	Two, appointed by the Hetman.

== Provincial offices ==
=== Voivodes and castellans ===
Of secular Senators, the foremost was the Castellan (Kasztelan) of Kraków. Other Castellans, however, were considered to be lesser dignitaries than the Voivodes.

The power of the Voivodes had declined since that title had been introduced about the 12th century; in the 17th century, however, they were still the highest regional dignitaries. They were the highest representatives of their Voivodeships to the Senat. They were the leaders of the Land Parliaments (Sejmiki Wojewódzkie, Voivodeship Sejmiks). They were in charge of assembling local nobility's military forces in the event of a pospolite ruszenie (levée en masse). Each chose a Deputy Voivode, who was responsible for setting local prices and measures. Voivodes were chosen by the King, except for those of Połock Voivode and Vilnius Voivode, who were elected by (and from) the local nobility (but still had to be appointed by the King).

Except for the Castellan of Kraków Land (which has its seat in a privileged city, as the Commonwealth's capital until 1596), Castellans were often considered subordinate to Voivodes. A Castellan was in charge of part of a Voivodeship (till the 15th century called a Castellany, and thereafter divided into provinces for Major Castellans and powiats for Minor Castellans).

=== Land offices ===
A 1611 Constitution (amended 1633 and 1635) prescribed many officials. Exceptions to the rule, however, were the rule; Sejm rules were treated as mere recommendations. Thus Bełz Voivodeship had only 4 of the 15 prescribed dignitaries; most northern voivodeships had about 5; and in Wołyń and Bracław Voivodeships the hierarchical order was almost reversed. Each province or district had its own set of officials—a list of provinces may be found in the article on provinces and geography of the Polish–Lithuanian Commonwealth.

District officials were appointed by the King, with a few exceptions (local parliaments—sejmiki—chose Chamberlains, District Judges, Deputy District Judges, District Clerks, and in Lithuania also Standard-bearers and District Marshals). Chamberlains, except for the name, had nothing in common with the Court officials of the same name. They administered a court of law (the Chamberlain's Court) which had jurisdiction over property disputes. The District Judge headed the District Court, which had jurisdiction over civil and some criminal matters involving local nobility.

The Starosta generalny ("General Starosta") was the official in charge of a specific territory. The Starosta grodowy ("City Starosta") was in charge of cities, while the Starosta niegrodowy ("Non-City Starosta") was responsible for administration of the Crown lands. These were to be kept in good financial and military order. While in time these administrative responsibilities became smaller (as Kings gave away more and more land), the Starosta remained in charge of the City Courts (sądy grodzkie), which dealt with most criminal matters and had jurisdiction over all local and visiting nobility. They dealt with the most severe cases (killings, rapes, robberies) and were quite harsh (highway robbery was punishable with death), which generally made Poland a safer country than its neighbors. The Starostas also held the "power of the sword", which meant that they enforced the verdicts of all other courts. Non-City Starostas had no juridical powers.

Standard-bearers carried the local banner during Royal ceremonies, and in war when local troops served in the Army. During war, Wojskis maintained order and security in their territories. In Lithuania, the responsibilities of Ciwuns were similar to those of non-city starostas (elders). District marshals presided over local parliaments (in the "Crown", District Marshals were chosen only for the duration of the parliament session, and so were much less powerful than those of Lithuania, who were chosen for life).

==== Crown ====
- Podkomorzy – Chamberlain
- Starosta grodowy – Mayor
- Chorąży – Standard-bearer
- Sędzia ziemski – District Judge
- Stolnik – Pantler
- Podczaszy – Royal Cupbearer
- Podsędek – Deputy District Judge
- Podstoli – Steward
- Cześnik – Cupbearer
- Łowczy – Master of the Hunt
- Wojski większy – Major Wojski
- Pisarz ziemski – District Clerk
- Miecznik – Sword-bearer
- Wojski mniejszy – Minor Wojski
- Skarbnik – Treasurer

==== Lithuania ====
- Marszałek ziemski – District Marshal
- Ciwun – Bailiff
- Podkomorzy – Chamberlain
- Starosta grodzki – Mayor
- Chorąży – Standard-bearer
- Sędzia ziemski – District judge
- Wojski większy – Major Wojski
- Stolnik – Pantler
- Podstoli – Steward
- Pisarz ziemski – District Clerk
- Podwojewódzki, Podstarosta – Deputy Voivod, Deputy Starosta
- Sędzia grodzki – City Judge
- Pisarz grodzki – City Clerk
- Podczaszy – Royal Cupbearer
- Cześnik – Cupbearer
- Horodniczy – Castellan
- Skarbnik – Treasurer
- Łowczy – Master of the Hunt
- Miecznik – Sword-bearer
- Koniuszy – Equerry
- Oboźny – Quartermaster
- Strażnik – Guard
- Krajczy – Carver
- Leśniczy – Forester
- Mostowniczy – Custodian of Bridges
- Budowniczy – Architect

==== Prussia ====
- Podkomorzy – Chamberlain
- Chorąży – Standard-bearer
- Sędzia – Judge
- Ławnik – Alderman
- Pisarz – Clerk
- Podwojewoda – Deputy Voivod (Deputy Governor)

=== Castle offices ===
The most important official was the Starosta. He was supported by a Borough Substarosta (podstarości grodowy), Burgrave (Burgrabia), Notary (Notariusz) and Scriptor (Pisarz). The Borough Substarosta assisted the Starosta and in his absence acted in his name with all his powers. Lower city officials were the Borough Regent (rejent grodzki), Borough Notary (notariusz grodzki), Borough Scriptor (pisarz grodzki) and common clerks ("subclerks" — podpiskowie).

In the eastern territories bordering on Russia, from 1667, a "Border Judge" cooperated with Russian judges in cases involving parties from the two countries; his rulings were final.

Judges were chosen from among the local hereditary nobles and had little formal training; therefore the quality of the courts varied from judge to judge, and levels of corruption were high. Attorneys, on the other hand, were required to have professional training. Sometimes a court included an asesor, who assisted the judge and collected fines and fees. Prosecutors were extremely rare. Instygators maintained order and security on court grounds, and a court runner (woźny) delivered summons.

=== List of borough and judicial offices ===
- Podstarosta grodowy – Borough Substarost
- Burgrabia – Burgrave
- Notariusz – Notary
- Rejent grodzki – Borough Regent
- Sędzia grodzki – Borough Judge
- Podsędek grodzki – Borough Subjudge
- Pisarz grodzki – Borough Clerk

In 1717 the "Numb Diet" barred non-Roman Catholics from being elected Envoys (to the Parliament), and to any other land offices if there was another Roman Catholic contender. The rights of the "Dissidents", as they were called, were reinstated in 1768, and in 1772 their representation in the Diet was limited to a statutory of two members. These rules were finally abolished in 1792 by the 3rd May Constitution.

== Town and village offices ==
These offices were very stable, having evolved about the 13th century and lasting almost unchanged to the end of the Polish–Lithuanian Commonwealth. The administrative system had come from Germany together with Magdeburg law.

Every city (without exception) had a Council and a Bench, the Council being the administrative branch and the Bench the judicial branch. A new Council was chosen by the old one whose term had expired. The Council was responsible for administration, law, privileges, security, finances, guild oversight, and the like. The Council chose the Mayor, and its members' decision was final—even the Starosta or Voivode could only listen to the Mayor's swearing-in and could not refuse to give him his seal. The Council met daily in the larger cities, less often in smaller ones.

The Mayor headed the Council and controlled the executive branch. He was responsible for conciliation, the care of the poor, and maintaining order by suppressing alcohol abuse and games of chance. Second to the Mayor was the Council Clerk, who ran the City Chancellery. The City Clerk (Syndyk Miejski) collected city taxes and supervised the tax collectors. Security and order in the city were the responsibility of the Hutman. He also supervised the city jail and the keyman who unlocked and locked the city gates at dawn and dusk.

The Lonar was the city treasurer, who oversaw its finances. He supervised the officials who controlled marketplace scales to ensure fair trade. Large cities also had scores of less common officials, such as Pipemasters, responsible for pipes and wells; Fire Chiefs; and City Translators, who assisted foreigners and looked out for spies.

The Bench was chaired by a wójt. He and the other Bench members were chosen by the Council for a year's term from among lesser city officials (writers, clerks, etc.).

City Chief Executioners executed not only criminals sentenced by the Bench, but often criminals sentenced by other non-military courts in Poland. They were well paid, sometimes functioned as physicians, but were also often considered social outcasts and lived outside the city walls.

A village mayor was called the sołtys and was the administrative, executive and judicial chief for the village, responsible only to the village's owner.

=== List of town and village offices ===
- Burmistrz – City Mayor;
- Wójt – Advocate-Mayor;
- Pisarz rady – Council Clerk;
- Syndyk miejski – City Clerk;
- Hutman – Constable;
- Lonar – City Treasurer.

== Other ==
- Starosta grodowy, Starosta sądowy – City Starosta, Judicial Starosta;
- Starosta generalny wielkopolski – General Starosta of Wielkopolska;
- Starosta generalny małopolski – General Starosta of Małopolska;
- Burgrabia zamku krakowskiego – Burgrave of Kraków Castle;
- Surrogat – Surrogate.

== Fictional offices ==
Fictional or fictitious offices were a specific kind of offices, as they referred to the territories which Polish–Lithuanian Commonwealth lost in the second half of the 17th century either to the Swedish Empire or the Tsardom of Russia. Following the Treaty of Oliva (1660), the Commonwealth officially lost Wenden Voivodeship, Parnawa Voivodeship, and Dorpat Voivodeship. Furthermore, as a result of the Truce of Andrusovo (1667), Poland-Lithuania lost Smolensk Voivodeship and Czernihow Voivodeship.

Despite the fact that these territories did not belong to the Commonwealth any longer, and were under foreign rule, their administration existed for further 100 years, until the Partitions of Poland, with a complex hierarchy of all kinds of regional offices. The existence of fictional titles was the result of the special role of offices in the minds of the Polish–Lithuanian nobility: even though these offices were only honorary, without any material privileges and salaries, they determined social status of their bearers. Furthermore, having a title, albeit fictional, emphasized the position of an individual nobleman as a keen citizen and co-creator of the Commonwealth.

After Czernihow Voivodeship was detached from Poland in 1667, sejmiks of the former province took place at Wlodzimierz Wolynski, some 500 kilometers west of Czernihow. Polish kings continued to present fictional titles of voivodes, senators, deputies, and starostas of Czernihow to their courtiers. In 1785, Stanisław August Poniatowski gave fictitious title of starosta of Nowogrod Siewierski to Tadeusz Czacki.

== See also ==
- List of szlachta
- Hetmans of the Polish–Lithuanian Commonwealth
- Order of precedence in the Polish–Lithuanian Commonwealth
- Szlachta
- Table of Ranks

== Bibliography ==
- Augustyniak, Urszula (2008). Historia Polski, 1572-1795 [History of Poland, 1572-1795] (in Polish). p. 61.
- Frost, Robert (2015). The Oxford History of Poland-Lithuania. Vol. I: The Making of the Polish-Lithuanian Union, 1385–1569. Oxford: Oxford University Press.
- Gąsiorowski, Antoni, ed. (1992). Urzędnicy centralni i nadworni Polski XIV-XVIII wieku. Spisy [Central and Court Officials of Poland from the 14th to the 18th Century. Lists] (in Polish). Vol. 10. Kórnik: Biblioteka Kórnicka.
- Góralski, Zbigniew (1988). Urzędy i godności w dawnej Polsce.
- Lulewicz, Henryk; Rachuba, Andrzej (1994). Urzędnicy centralni i dygnitarze Wielkiego Księstwa Litewskiego XIV-XVIII wieku. Spisy [Central Officials and Dignitaries of the Grand Duchy of Lithuania from the 14th to the 18th Century. Lists] (in Polish). Vol. 10. Kórnik: Biblioteka Kórnicka.
- Wimmer, Jan (1965). Wojsko polskie w drugiej połowie XVII wieku [The Polish Army in the Second Half of the 17th Century] (in Polish). Warsaw: Wydawnictwo Ministerstwa Obrony Narodowej.
- Wolff, Józef (1885). Senatorowie i dygnitarze Wielkiego Księstwa Litewskiego 1386-1795. Kraków: W. L. Anczyca.
