= Michał Grocholski =

Polish noble

- Coat of arms: Syrokomla
- Born: 1705
- Died: 1765 (aged 59–60)
- Family: Grocholski
- Consort: Agnieszka Radzymińska
- Issue: Franciszka Grocholska; Justyna Grocholska; Petronela Grocholska; Aniela Grocholska; Agnieszka Grocholska; Marcin Grocholski; Franciszek Grocholski

Michał Grocholski (1705–1765) was a Polish szlachcic.

Grocholski was born in 1705 and served in the armoured cavalry regiment (Chorągiew pancerna) of Stanisław Leszczyński. He was Cześnik of Braclaw since 1736, District judge of Braclaw since 1744 and Rotmistrz of an Armoured Cavalry Regiment, designated by King August III of Poland. He married Anna Radzimińska in 1752 and inherited the estates of Saborów, Soroszyn, Woronowice, and Stepanówka. Grocholski donated to the church and community causes, establishing a Dominican church and monastery at Winnica.
