= Émigré =

Person who has emigrated

An émigré (French: [emigʁe]) is a person who has emigrated, often with a connotation of political or social exile or self-exile. The word is the past participle of the French verb émigrer meaning "to emigrate".

== French Huguenots ==
Many French Huguenots fled France following the Revocation of the Edict of Nantes in 1685.

== American Revolution ==
Many Loyalists, who made up large portions of colonial United States particularly in the South, emigrated by choice or were forced to leave the United States during and after the American Revolution. Common destinations were other parts of the British Empire, such as Upper Canada, Nova Scotia, Great Britain, Jamaica, and the British West Indies. The new government often awarded the lands of fleeing Loyalists to Patriot soldiers by way of land grants.

== French Revolution ==
Although the French Revolution began in 1789 as a bourgeois-led drive for increased political equality for the Third Estate, it soon turned into a violent popular rebellion. To escape political tensions and sometimes in fear for their lives, some emigrated from France, settling in neighboring countries, chiefly Great Britain, Spain, Germany, Austria, and Prussia. A few also migrated to North America.

== Partitions of Poland and Polish uprisings ==
Throughout the nineteenth century Poland was occupied by the partitioning powers of Poland: Austria, Prussia and Russia. Poles struggled for independence in a series of failed uprisings, which resulted in many having to seek refuge in Western Europe (known as the Wielka Emigracja) in order to avoid reprisals, such as being forcefully sent to the vast and harsh emptiness of Siberia. The exiles included artists, soldiers, politicians and prisoners-of-war who escaped from captivity. Most of the political émigrés based themselves in France.

The spirit of Polish émigrés lives on through one of the unofficial mottos of Poland: For our freedom and yours (Polish: Za naszą i waszą wolność)

== Russian Revolution ==
The Bolshevik Revolution of 1917 and the subsequent Russian Civil War led many notable political and intellectual figures to leave Russia and neighboring states. Among these, Russian "White" émigrés, who fervently opposed the new communist regime, fled west after their defeat in the civil war. Other groups would also leave Russia, most notably the Mensheviks as well as leaders and intellectuals from defeated countries such as the Ukrainian People's Republic and the Democratic Republic of Georgia.

Marx and Engels, drafting their strategy for future revolutions in The Communist Manifesto, suggested confiscating the property of émigrés to finance the revolution—a recommendation the Bolsheviks followed 70 years later.

After the October Revolution, more than 20,000 émigrés went to Finland and Yugoslavia, notably Pyotr Wrangel. Many however moved on to France. Paris was the favourite destination for Russian émigrés. Many others traveled east to China, especially to Harbin and Shanghai.

== 20th century émigrés ==
Aristocrats of some European countries were forced to leave their native lands by political upheavals from the beginning of the 20th century to the end of World War II opting to emigrate elsewhere such as the Serbs and Romanians in 1945 and after, Hungarians in 1956 and the Czechs and Slovaks in 1968.

In 2016, 5,411 US citizens living in other countries relinquished their US citizenship. This is often attributed to extraterritorial laws on US citizens, such as the Foreign Account Tax Compliance Act of 2010. In comparison, there were only 235 expatriations in 2008.

== South Africa ==
After the historical electoral victory in South Africa by the ANC (African National Congress) in 1994, many Afrikaners emigrated from South Africa to other countries, citing discrimination in employment and social violence as reasons.

According to the 2011 Australian census there are 145,683 South African émigrés, born in South Africa, in Australia, of whom 30,291 reside in the city of Perth or greater Perth area.

== See also ==
- Auto-segregation
- Defection
- Dissent
- Muhajir (Urdu-speaking people)
