= Stanisław Zamoyski =

- Coat of arms: Jelita
- Born: 1519
- Died: 1572 (aged 52–53)
- Noble family: Zamoyski
- Consorts: Anna Herburt; Anna Orzechowska
- Father: Feliks Zamoyski
- Mother: Anna Uhrowiecka
- Occupation: nobleman

Stanisław Zamoyski (1519–1572) was a Polish nobleman (szlachcic). He was Łowczy of Chełmno since 1561, castellan of Chełmno since 1566, Court Hetman of the Crown and starost of Belz.

He was married to Anna Herburt and had three children with her: Jan Zamoyski, Feliks Zamoyski and Anna Zamoyska. He was later married to Anna Orzechowska with whom he had two children: Elżbieta Zamoyska and Zofia Zamoyska.
