= Pro Fide, Lege et Rege =

18th-century motto of the Polish–Lithuanian Commonwealth

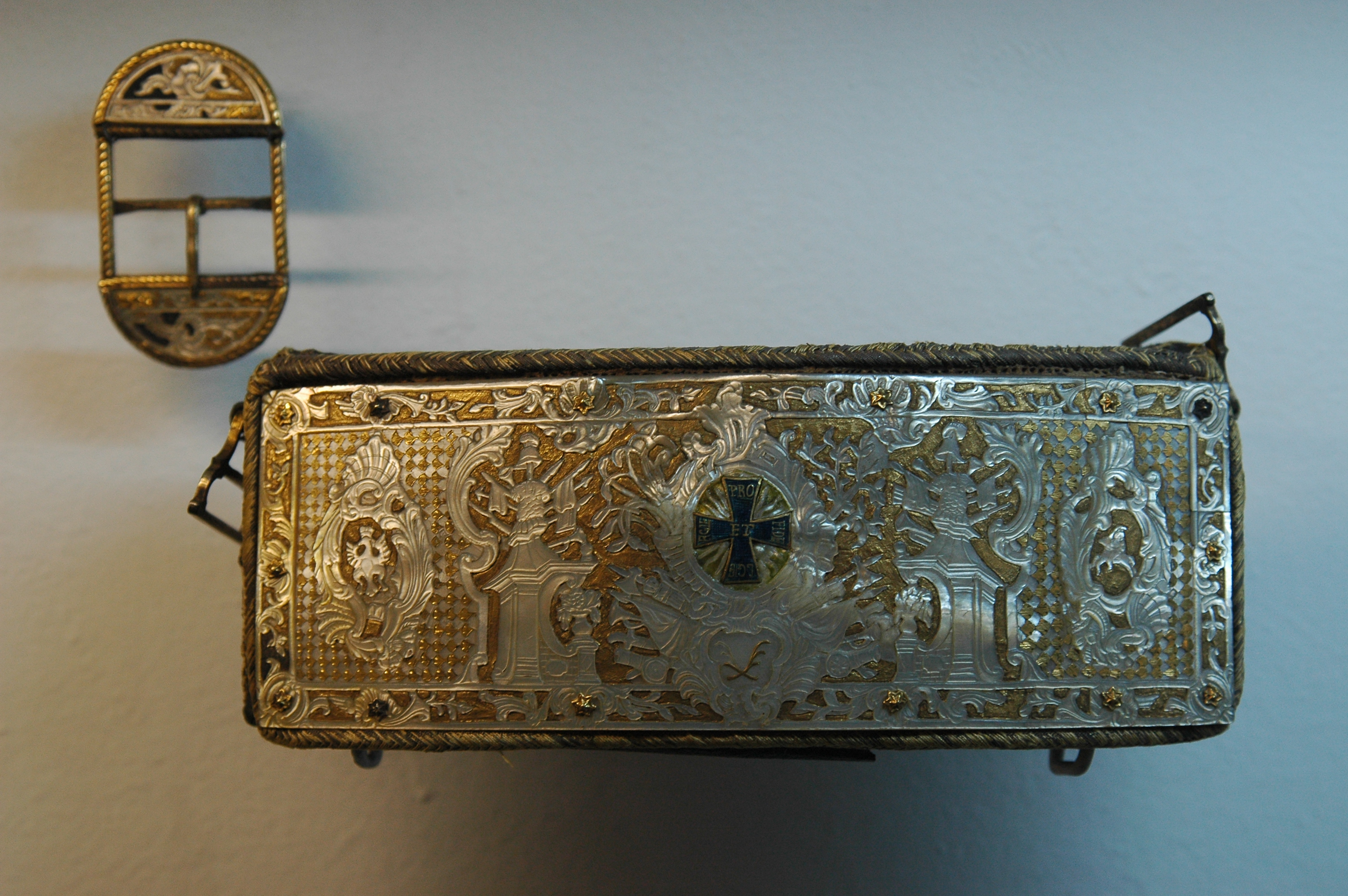
A cartridge box of Polish 18th century infantry, bearing the motto of Pro Fide, Lege et Rege.

Pro Fide, Lege et Rege (Latin for "For Faith, Law and King") was an 18th-century motto of the Polish–Lithuanian Commonwealth and then of Poland. It superseded the earlier Si Deus Nobiscum quis contra nos (Latin for "If God is with us, then who is against us") and was featured on a variety of buildings, military decorations and equipment. It remains the motto of the Order of the White Eagle. The slogan of the order was that of the king's pro fide lege et grege (Latin for "For Faith, Justice, and the Nation"). The device of the cavaliers was pro fide lege et rege (Latin for "For Faith, Justice, and the King").

The slogan is used as the title of the Polish scientific journal of the Institute of Genealogy.

== See also ==
- Unofficial mottos of Poland
  - Bóg, Honor, Ojczyzna
  - Za wolność Naszą i Waszą
