= Syrokomla coat of arms =

Polish coat of arms

Syrokomla
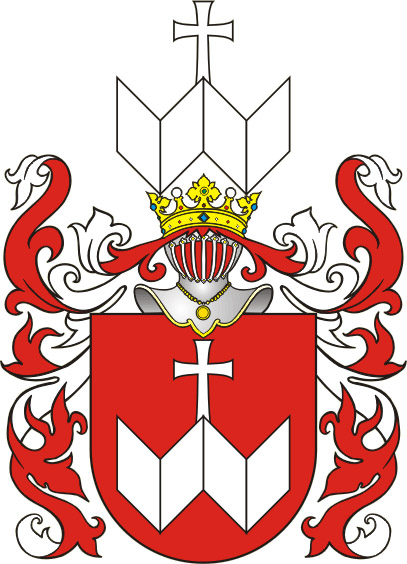
- Battle cry: Syrokomla
- Alternative name: Srokomla
- Earliest mention: 1354
- Towns: none
- Families: 95 altogether: Andronowski, Bortkiewicz, Bułhak, Burdzicki, Burdziński, Chominicz, Chorzewski, Chybicki, Diakowicz, Drankiewicz, Dziewoczka, Gasztowt, Gosztowt, Grocholski, Gucewicz, Gumkowski, Hołub, Horszewski, Horszowski, Hryhorewicz, Imszeński, Iwanowski, Jałowski Baranowicz, Jeleniowski, Jodławski, Karoński, Kaznowski, Kęsicki, Kiiński, Kijankowski, Kijanowski, Kijański, Kijeński, Kiltynowicz, Kiński, Kirkillo, Kondradzki, Kondrat, Kondratowicz, Kondratowski, Konratowicz, Konratowiski, Korzekwicki, Korzenicki, Kościałkowski, Kurdwanowski, Łapicki, Masło, Masłow, Minelg, Minelgowicz, Mingel, Mingiel, Mingin, Modzelewski, Montrym, Montrymowicz, Ososko, Płaszkowski, Puchaczewski, Pulia, Putiatycki, Putyatycki, Rekść, Sapalski, Sehem, Sicheń, Sieheń, Sielanka, Siwczyński, Stefanowicz, Stefanowski, Syrokomla, Szwyaszkowski, Śnieszkowski, Świaszkowski, Świeszkowski, Święszkowski, Świężkowski ze Święszek, Turowicki, Wasilewicz, Wielicki, Wieliczki, Wieliczko, Witoniski, Wojczon, Wojczun, Wojniłowicz, Wojtałowicz, Woyczon, Woyniłowicz, Wyrwicz, Zagrocki, Zagrodzki, Zając, Żołędź, Życzyński

Syrokomla is a Polish coat of arms. It was used by several szlachta families in the times of the Polish–Lithuanian Commonwealth.

== History ==
According to the legend, the coat of arms was granted to certain knight named Syrokomla of Abdank coat of arms after he won a duel with a pagan Old Prussian warrior in 1331 during the reign of Ladislaus the Short. After this victory he was awarded with a right to add a golden cross to his coat of arms, to underline that he is one of the defenders of Christianity.

== Blazon ==
Gules, Abdank (W-shaped symbol) Argent, with a cross Or (sometimes Argent) attached above. In the crest the symbol repeated.

== Notable bearers ==
Notable bearers of this coat of arms include:

- Michał Grocholski
- Franciszek Grocholski
- Władysław Syrokomla (1823-1862), writer

== See also ==
- Polish heraldry
- Heraldry
