= Long Live Belarus! =

Belarusian political and patriotic slogan

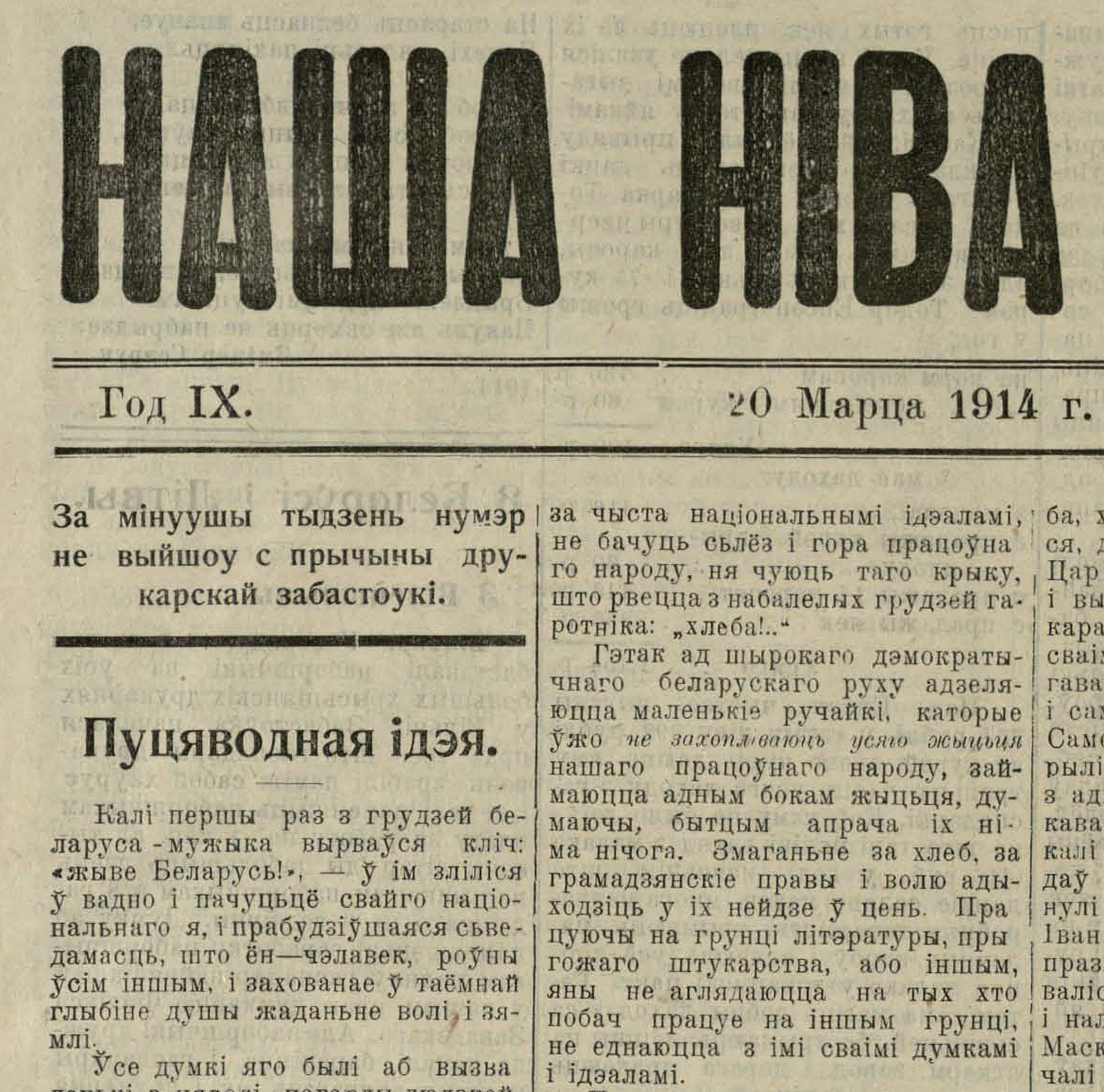
The front page of the newspaper "Nasha Niva" with the slogan "Long live Belarus!", 1914

"Long Live Belarus!" (Belarusian: Жыве Беларусь!, romanized: Žyvie Biełaruś! [ʐɨˈvʲe bʲeɫaˈrusʲ]) is a Belarusian patriotic motto and proposed former national anthem, widely used by members of the Belarusian democratic and nationalist opposition, as well as by members of the Belarusian diaspora.

The motto is aimed at awakening the national civil sense, the consolidation of the Belarusian people to protect the freedom and independence of their country, language, and national culture. It is often accompanied by the response "(She) lives forever!" (Belarusian: Жыве вечна!, romanized: Žyvie viečna! [ʐɨˈvʲe ˈvʲetʃna]).

== History ==
Protesters shouting "Long Live Belarus". Minsk, 20 September 2020

Belarusian poet Yanka Kupala ended his 1905–1907 poem "This is a Cry That Belarus Lives" with this phrase.

In December 1917, the First All-Belarusian Congress displayed the flag with the inscription "Long Live Free Belarus!".

It is displayed on the logo of a major state-owned newspaper, Narodnaya Gazeta. However, there have been cases of arrests for publicly calling out the motto at demonstrations.

The phrase has been widely used by opponents of President Alexander Lukashenko, both inside and outside of Belarus, during the 2020 Belarusian protests.

== Lyrics ==
Belarusian original

Жыве Беларусь! Веру, будзе жыць заўсёды!
Сьвятло Пагоні будзе сэрцы нашы акрыляць.
Жыве, жыве наш Край магутны і свабодны,
Нескароная нікім і сьвятая Зямля.
Беларусь, Беларусь, хай цябе мінуць усе нягоды.
Век у шчасьці жыві, ты Радзіма мая!

Жыве Беларусь, нашай волі абуджэньне.
Краіна-маці, ты прызнаньне шчырае прымі.
Жыве, жыве, гучыць узьнёсла бласлаўленьне —
Беларускі горды дух увасстаў з даўніны.
Беларусь, Беларусь, мы тваё вітаем Адраджэньне
Будзеш вечна вольнай ты, будзем вольнымі мы.

Жыве Беларусь, нас нядоля не здалела.
Магутны Божа, беражы Айчыну з году ў год.
Жыве, жыве, як непагасны сымбаль веры,
Будзеш вечна на зямлі паспаліты наш Род.
Беларусь, Беларусь, пад штандарам бел-чырвона-белым
Век у шчасьці жыві Беларускі Народ!

Łacinka

Žyvie Biełaruś! Vieru, budzie žyć zaŭsiody!
Śviatło Pahoni budzie sercy našy akrylać.
Žyvie, žyvie naš Kraj mahutny i svabodny,
Nieskaronaja nikim i śviataja Ziamla.
Biełaruś, Biełaruś, chaj ciabie minuć usie niahody.
Viek u ščaści žyvi, ty Radzima maja!

Žyvie Biełaruś, našaj voli abudžeńnie.
Kraina-maci, ty pryznańnie ščyraje prymi.
Žyvie, žyvie, hučyć uźniosła błasłaŭleńnie —
Biełaruski hordy duch uvasstaŭ z daŭniny.
Biełaruś, Biełaruś, my tvajo vitajem Adradžeńnie
Budzieš viečna volnaj ty, budziem volnymi my.

Žyvie Biełaruś, nas niadola nie zdaleła.
Mahutny Boža, bieražy Ajčynu z hodu ŭ hod.
Žyvie, žyvie, jak niepahasny symbal viery.
Budzieš viečna na ziamli paspality naš Rod.
Biełaruś, Biełaruś, pas štandaram bieł-čyrvona-biełym
Viek u ščaści žyvi Biełaruski Narod!

English translation

Long live Belarus! I believe she'll live on forever!
The light of the Pursuit shall brighten our hearts.
Live on, live on, our powerful and free Land,
Untouched by anyone and holy Earth.
Belarus, Belarus, let all troubles pass by thee.
Live happily ever after, thou art my Motherland!

Long live Belarus, the awakening of our will.
O Motherland, accept this sincere confession.
Live on, live on, the exalted blessing sounds —
The proud Belarusian spirit arose from ancient times.
Belarus, Belarus, we welcome thy Renaissance
Thou shalt forever be free, we shall be free.

Long live Belarus, misfortune has not left us.
O Mighty God, protect the Motherland from year to year.
Live on, Live on, as an indelible symbol of faith,
Thou shalt forever be part of our family on earth.
Belarus, Belarus, under the white-red-white standard
Long live the Belarusian people in happiness!

== See also ==
- Konstanty Kalinowski
- Viva Belarus!
- Слава України!
- Czołem Wielkiej Polsce
- עם ישראל חי
- Yaşasın Azərbaycan
- Jai Hind
- Joy Bangla
- God Bless America
