= Cupbearer =

Officer who pours (sometimes tastes) monarch's drinks

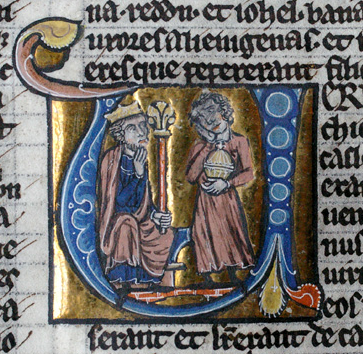
Nehemiah as cupbearer to Artaxerxes I of Persia; Illuminated Bible from the 1220s, National Library of Portugal

A cupbearer was historically an officer of high rank in royal courts, whose duty was to pour and serve the drinks at the royal table. On account of the constant fear of plots and intrigues (such as poisoning), a person had to be regarded as thoroughly trustworthy to hold the position. He would guard against poison in the king's cup, and was sometimes required to swallow some of the drink before serving it. His confidential relations with the king often gave him a position of great influence.

A9

Egyptian hieroglyph for a cupbearer

The cupbearer as an honorific role, for example as the Egyptian hieroglyph for "cupbearer", was used as late as 196 BC in the Rosetta Stone for the canephora cupbearer Areia, daughter of Diogenes; each Ptolemaic Decree starting with the Decree of Canopus honored a cupbearer. A much older role was the appointment of Sargon of Akkad as cupbearer in the 23rd century BC.

== In the Bible ==
Cupbearers are mentioned several times in the Bible.

The position is first mentioned in Genesis 40:1-23, where a cupbearer and a baker reveal their dreams to Joseph. (Note: Some translations, including the King James Version, refer to the butler and the baker.) The phrase "chief of the cupbearers" (Genesis 40:2) accords with the fact that there were often a number of such officials under one as chief.

Cupbearers are also mentioned in 1 Kings 10:5, and 2 Chronicles 9:4, where they, among other evidences of royal splendor, are stated to have impressed the Queen of Sheba with Solomon's glory. The title Rabshakeh (Isaiah 36:2), once thought to mean "chief of the cupbearers" is now given a different derivation and explained as "chief of the officers" or "princes".

In the post-exilic period, Nehemiah rose to the high ranking palace position of cupbearer to King Artaxerxes, the sixth King of the Median / Persian Empire. The position placed his life on the line every day, but gave Nehemiah authority and high pay. He was held in high esteem by Artaxerxes, as the record shows. His financial ability would indicate that the office was a lucrative one.

== In Greek myth ==
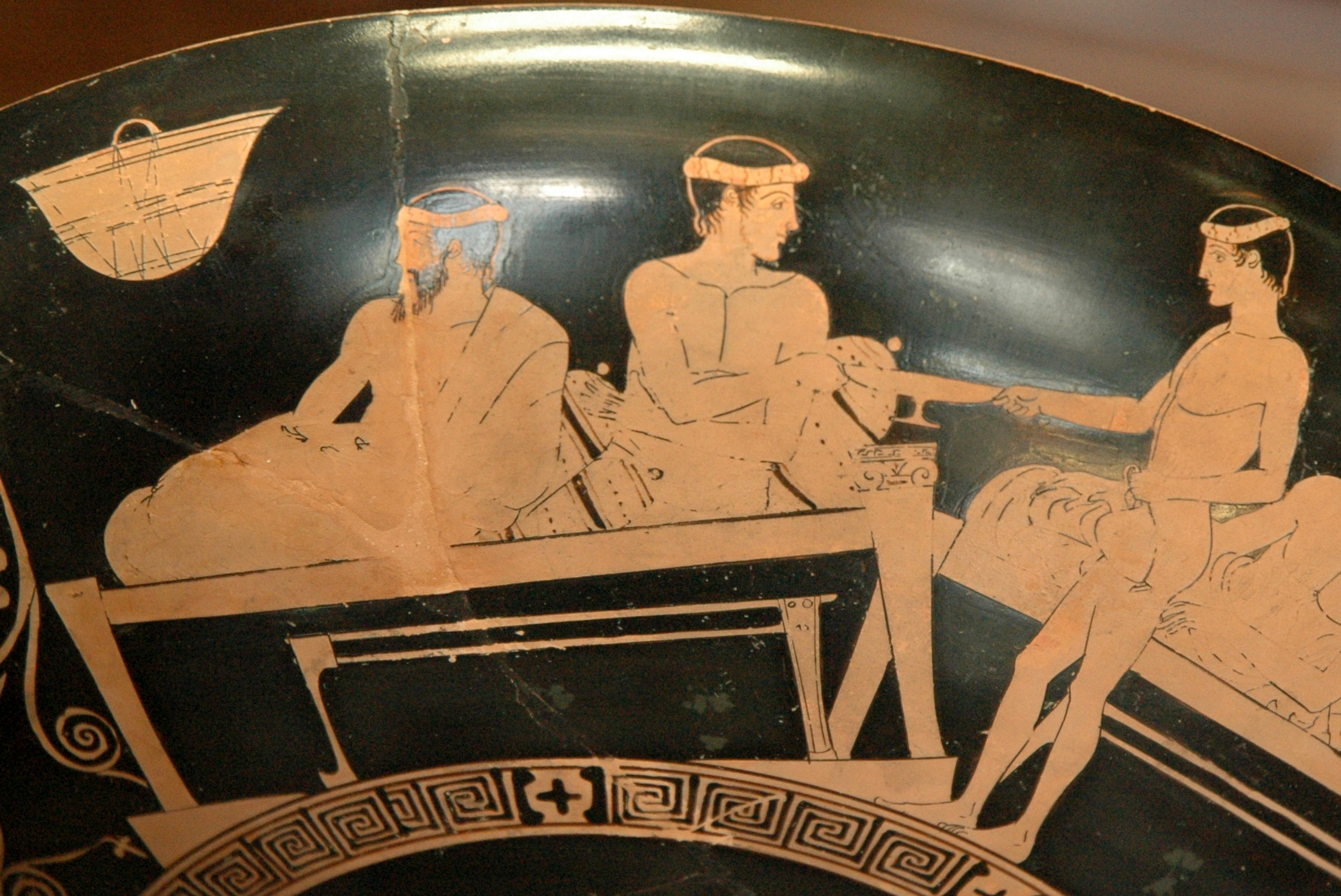
A cupbearer depicted c. 460–450 BC

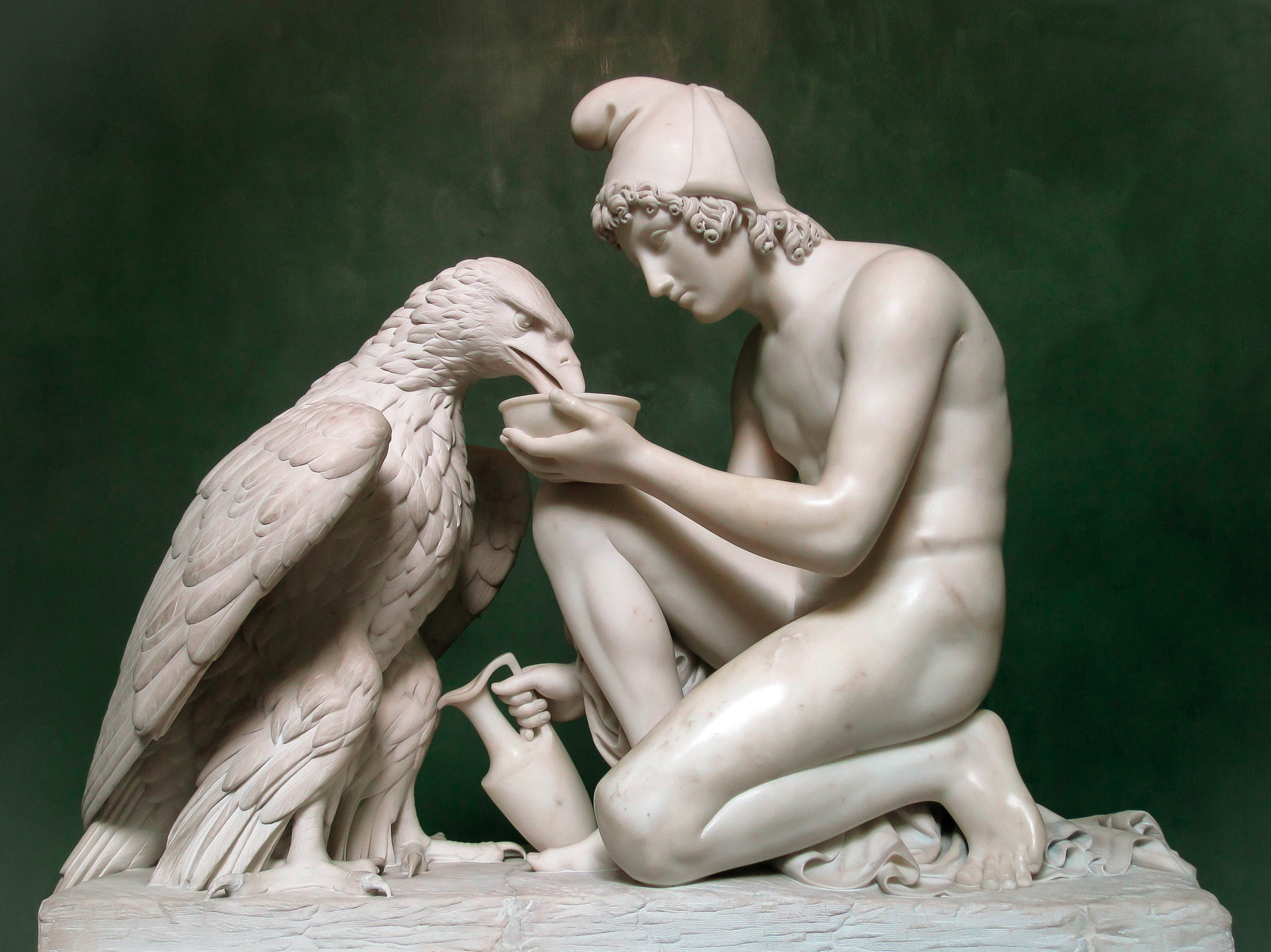
Ganymede and the Eagle, sculpture by Bertel Thorvaldsen, c. 1817

In Greek mythology, Hebe, the goddess of youth, was the original cupbearer to the Greek gods of Mount Olympus, serving them nectar and ambrosia. Hebe is the daughter of Hera and Zeus and is described performing her duties as cupbearer in the Iliad:

The gods were seated near to Zeus in council,
upon a golden floor. Graciously Hêbê
served them nectar, as with cups of gold
they toasted one another, looking down
toward the stronghold of Ilion.

— Homer. Iliad. 5.1–5.

Hêbê's role of cup bearer ended when she was then replaced by Ganymede.

Hephaestus, Hermes, Iris, Athena, and Zeus have all been depicted as cupbearers at various points in time. Hephaestus poured nectar for his mother Hera and the other gods in the Iliad. Hermes poured ambrosia for the wedding of Peleus and Thetis in the poems of Sappho. Iris poured wine for Hera across various artistic representations. And Athena may have done so in the works of Bacchylides. Zeus posed as a cupbearer in the court of the Titans in order to poison his father Cronus, causing him to expel his swallowed children.

The Roman gods are also closely related to Greek mythology, with the Roman goddess of youth Juventas being the counterpart to Greek Hebe.

== As palatine officers in Visigothic Spain ==
One of the palatine officers who was in the service of the Visigothic kings was called Comes Scanciorum, or "Count of the Cupbearers." The count headed the scancia (singular scancium), which in English would be called cellars or buttery and in French échansonnerie, which is a cognate to the Latinized Gothic term used in Spain. The count would have poured the king's wine or drink personally while the other cupbearers served other distinguished guests at the royal table.

== As a Great Office in the Holy Roman Empire ==
Schenk or Schenck (Latin pincerna), also Mundschenk, was originally a Germanic court office and was associated, among other things, with the supervision of the court wine cellars and vineyards. The king of Bohemia ranked as arch-cupbearer of the Holy Roman Empire. His duties were normally performed only during coronations. At other times, the count of Limpurg and, after 1714, count of Althann served as cupbearers for the emperor.

== In Anglo-Saxon England ==
The office of butler or cupbearer (pincerna in Medieval Latin) in Anglo-Saxon England was occupied by aristocrats who were in charge of drinks at royal feasts. In the tenth and eleventh centuries they were appointed from among the thegns, the third rank of nobles, after the king and ealdormen.

== In Shakespeare ==
Camillo in The Winter's Tale is cupbearer to Leontes, King of Sicily, and Polixenes, King of Bohemia. When Leontes becomes convinced of his wife Hermione's infidelity with Polixenes, he entreats Camillo to use his privileged position as his cupbearer to poison Polixenes:

Ay, and thou
his cupbearer, whom I from meaner form
have benched and reared to worship, who mayst see
plainly, as heaven sees earth sees heaven,
how I am gallèd, might bespice a cup
to give mine enemy a lasting wink
which draft to me were cordial.

— Shakespeare, The Winter's Tale (1.2)

== In Ireland ==
Theobald Walter was the first Chief Butler of Ireland. Although the terms "cupbearer" and "butler" are sometimes used interchangeably, they were two distinct roles at the coronation feast.

== Kingdom of Hungary ==
The pohárnokmester (Master of the Cupbearers), also called the főpohárnok, was the supervisor of the cupbearers at court and across the royal court system, a chief court officer/dignitary. The first mention of him dates from 1148.

== Poland and Lithuania ==
The cupbearer (Polish: cześnik, Lithuanian: taurininkas) was a court office in Poland and Lithuania until the end of the 13th century. The holder was responsible for the wine cellar of the King and Grand Duke, serving him cups of wine at banquets. From the 14th century on, it was an honorary court title in the Crown of Poland and Grand Duchy of Lithuania, and in the Polish–Lithuanian Commonwealth.

- cześnik koronny – King's Cupbearer of the Crown
- cześnik litewski – Grand Duke's Cupbearer of Lithuania
- cześnik ziemski – District King's Cupbearer

According to the district office hierarchy in 1768, the position in the Crown was over Łowczy and under Podstoli; In the Grand Duchy of Lithuania over Horodniczy (Gorodnyčius) and under Podczaszy (Pataurininkis).

== Russia ==
The native term was chashnik, and the cup-bearer, who was selected from among the boyars, was an office in the household of a monarch in the Russian principalities and Tsardom of Russia. Later, in the Russian Empire, it was replaced by the word '(ober)-schenk' borrowed from German. A related term was Виночерпий, Vinocherpiy, 'vine fetcher'.

== See also ==
- The dictionary definition of cupbearer at Wiktionary
- Bartender
- Food taster
- Paharnic
- Pinkernes
- Sommelier
