= Swordbearer (Poland) =

Polish office

Swordbearer (Polish: miecznik) was a court office in Poland. Officeholders were responsible for the arsenal of the king, and for carrying the king's sword.

Beginning in the 14th century, Polish: miecznik existed as a title, first in the Kingdom of Poland (1385–1569), then after the Union of Lublin, in the Polish–Lithuanian Commonwealth.

- Swordbearer of the Crown
- Swordbearer of Lithuania

== See also ==
- Offices in the Polish–Lithuanian Commonwealth
