= Order of the White Eagle (Poland) =

Polish decoration of merit

Order of the White Eagle Order Orła Białego
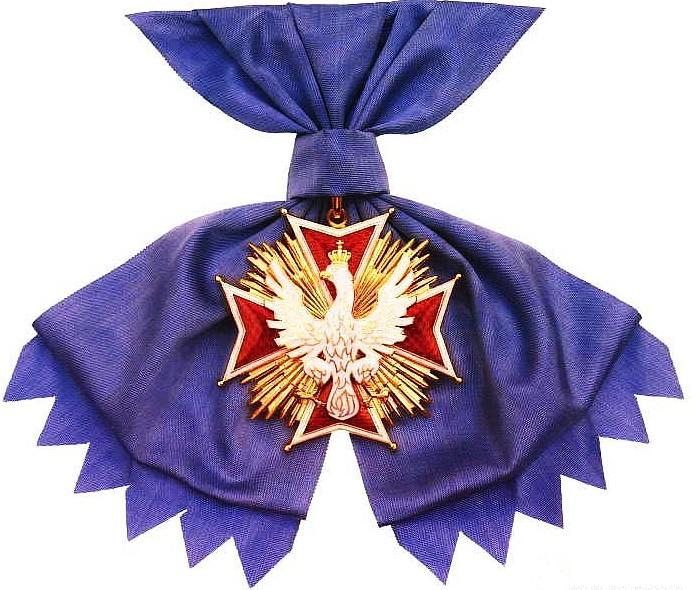

Awarded by the President of Poland (previously King of Poland)
- Type: Single grade order
- Established: 1 November 1705
- Country: Poland
- Motto: PRO FIDE, LEGE ET REGE (For Faith, Law and King); ZA OJCZYZNĘ I NARÓD (For Fatherland and Nation)
- Eligibility: All
- Status: Currently awarded
- Grand Master: President of Poland; Karol Nawrocki
- Grades: Knight

Statistics
- Total inductees: 355 (since 1921)

Precedence
- Next (higher): none – highest award
- Next (lower): Order Virtuti Militari (military); Order of Polonia Restituta (civilian)
- The ribbon bar of the Order

The Order of the White Eagle (Polish: Order Orła Białego) is the highest honour of the Republic of Poland and formerly the Second Polish Republic and the Polish–Lithuanian Commonwealth and one of the oldest state decorations in the world still in use. It was officially instituted on 1 November 1705 by Augustus II the Strong, King of Poland and Elector of Saxony, and bestowed on eight of his closest diplomatic and political supporters. It has since been awarded to the most distinguished Poles for their merits and occasionally to the heads of state of foreign countries.

The Order of the White Eagle is attached to an azure sash slung over the left shoulder to the right side. The star of the Order, formerly embroidered, is worn on the left side of the chest. Unlike other Polish high decorations, the Order of the White Eagle does not have different classes or crosses.

== History ==
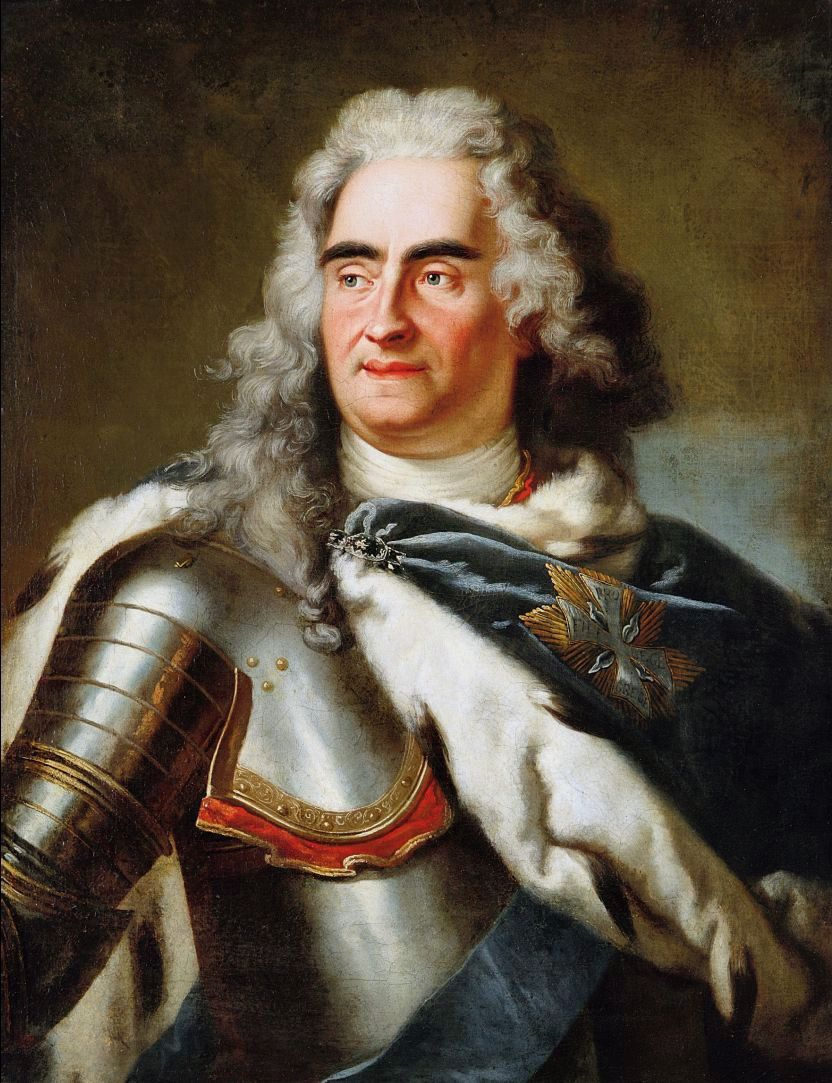
Augustus the Strong wearing the original Order of the White Eagle with an embroidered Grand Cross. Portrait by Louis de Silvestre from around 1718

The badge of the Order of the White Eagle was originally a red enamel oval gold medal with an image of the Polish white eagle on its front side, and the royal cypher of Augustus II the Strong over crossed swords on the obverse, worn on a light blue ribbon. The white eagle badge was replaced by a Maltese cross badge in 1709. By 1713 it was worn from the neck, with a blue sash, and a star. Augustus limited the number of knights to 72, but only conferred the Order 40 times before his death in 1733. His son, Augustus III, however, awarded the Order more than three hundred times. Augustus may have been inspired to found the Order by the example of Peter the Great's recent founding of the Russian Order of Saint Andrew (of which he himself had been made one of the first knights by the Russian emperor), and above all by the example of the prestigious French Order of the Holy Spirit, with which the light blue ribbon, and the star with a bird, have a strong resemblance, and which had also inspired Peter the Great's Order of Saint Andrew.

Initially, the creation of the Order was strongly opposed by many of the Polish nobility, since membership in the Order conferred a distinction which violated the traditional equality of all Polish nobles. Since the Order had no patron saint, Augustus II made 2 August the feast of the Order. His son, Augustus III, however, changed the Order's feast day to 3 August.

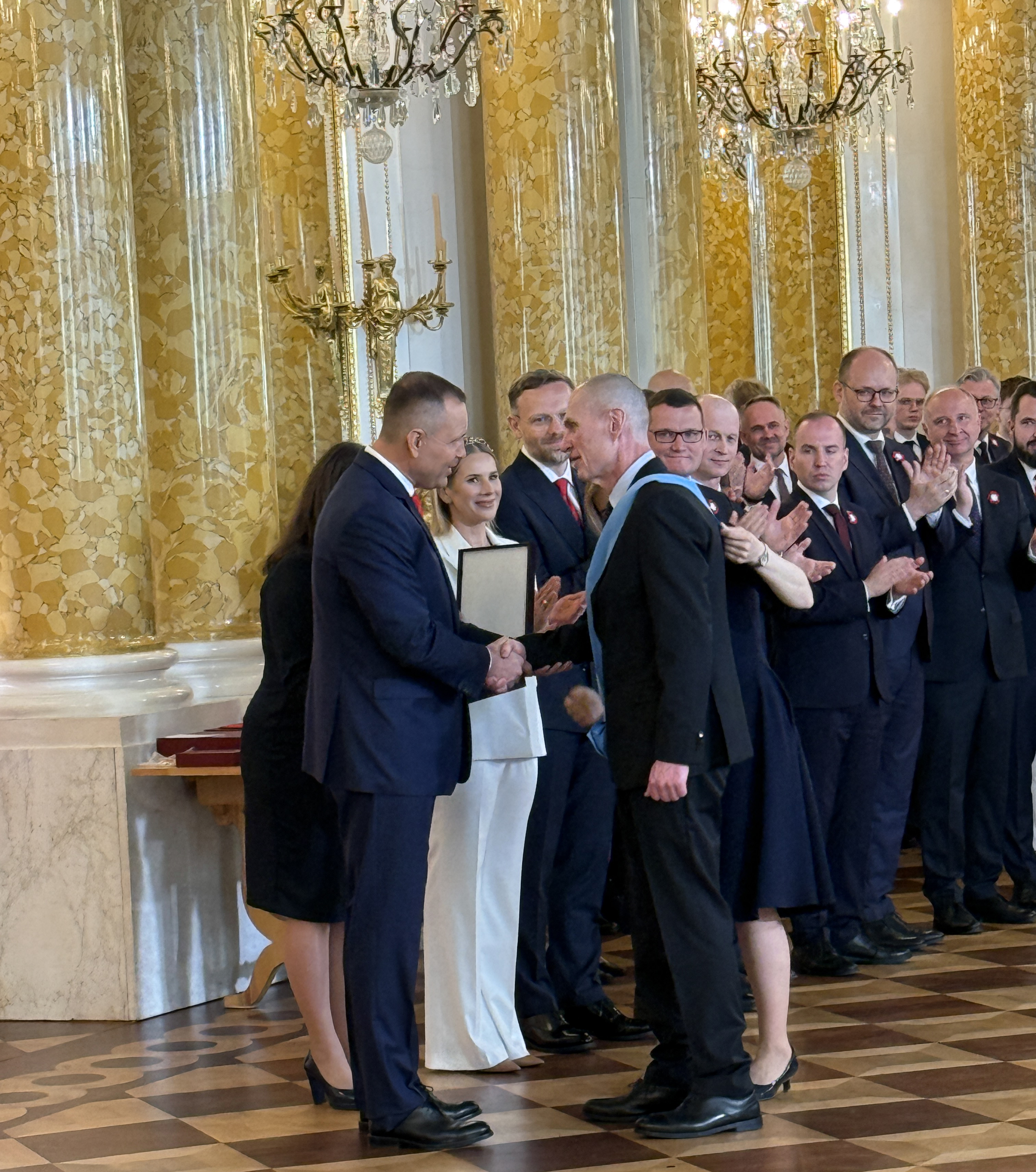
Andrzej Poczobut being awarded the Order of the White Eagle after his release from a Belarusian prison in 2026

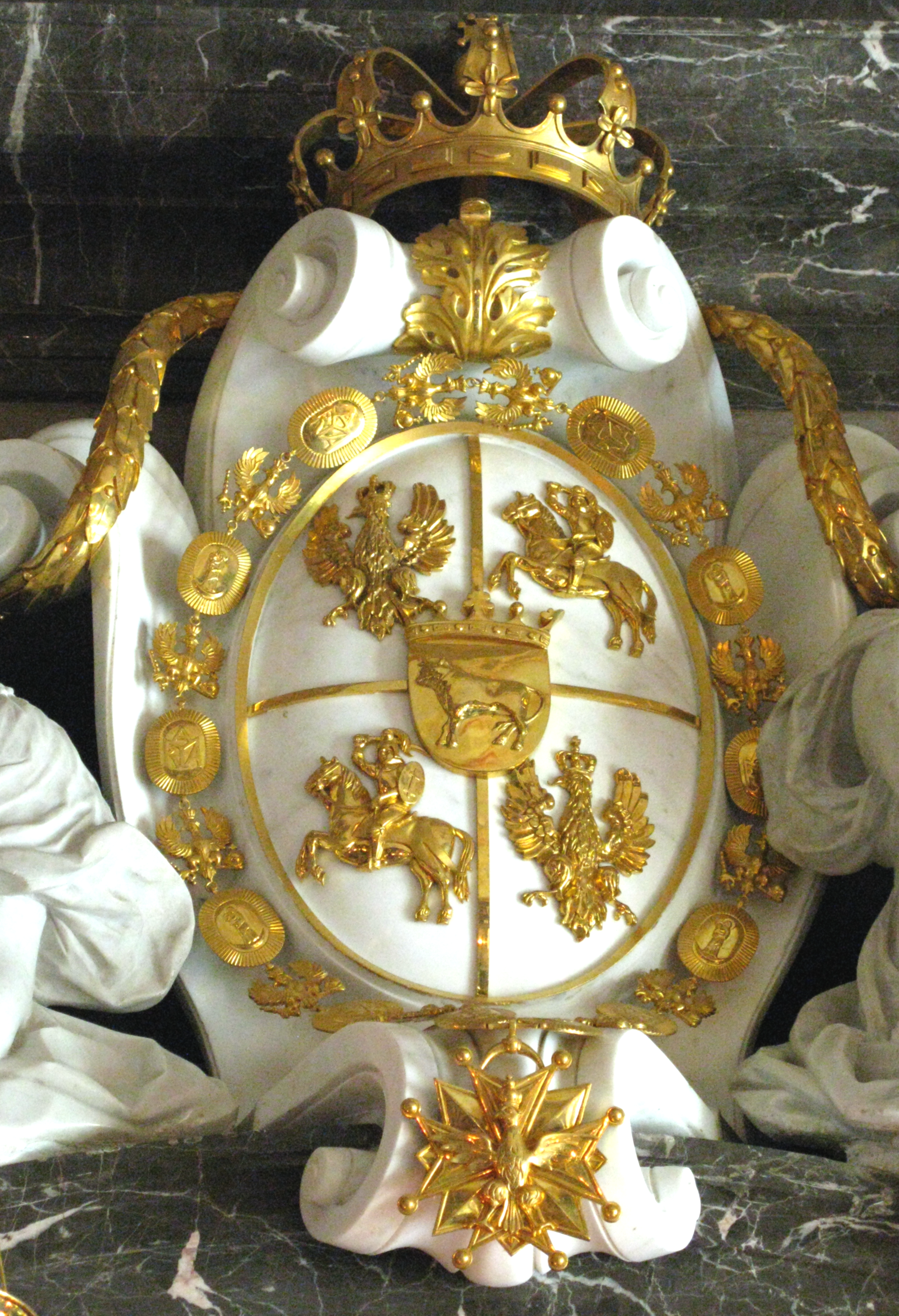
Coat of Arms of Stanisław II Augustus with collar of the Order of the White Eagle

Under the Third Partition of Poland in 1795, the Order was abolished. It was renewed in 1807 as the highest award of the Duchy of Warsaw, created by Napoleon Bonaparte. From 1815 to 1831, it was awarded in the Congress Kingdom of Poland.

After Russian troops put down the Polish uprising of 1830–31 in Congress Poland, the Order of the White Eagle was officially "annexed" by Nicholas I, and on 17 November 1831 became part of the Russian Imperial honors system. The insignia of this new Imperial Russian Order of the White Eagle was modified to more closely resemble those of Russian orders. It remained in this form until the Russian Revolution of 1917, in which the Russian Empire fell.

The Order of the White Eagle officially became Poland's highest decoration by act of Parliament of 4 February 1921, and the insignia was redesigned. During the interbellum (1921–1939), the Order was awarded to 24 Polish citizens and 87 foreigners, among whom were 33 monarchs and heads of state, 10 prime ministers and 15 other ministers of state, and 12 members of royal families.

After 1948, when the Polish People's Republic came into existence, the Order of the White Eagle was no longer awarded, but it was never officially abolished. It was also used by the Polish Government in Exile. Following the collapse of Communism, the Order was once again reinstated on 26 October 1992, the Polish Government-in-Exile having already presented the seal and archives of the Order to Lech Wałęsa. The first person to be awarded the White Eagle after its reinstatement was Pope John Paul II. The President of Poland as the country's head of state is the Grand Master of the Order.

=== Declined and revoked awards ===
Only two people were stripped of the order during more than 300 years of its existence: Polish Prime Minister Wincenty Witos, who had the Order reinstated, and Ukrainian President Volodymyr Zelenskyy. The order has also been declined or returned back by several politicians, from Tadeusz Kościuszko to several Ukrainian presidents.

==== Tadeusz Kościuszko ====
Tadeusz Kościuszko was offered the award by Stanisław August Poniatowski in 1792, but as a republican refused to accept an honour from a monarch.

==== Wincenty Witos ====
Wincenty Witos, who served as Prime Minister of Poland, was the first person who was stripped off the Order, in 1932, however in 1939 he got it back.

==== Jerzy Giedroyc ====
Jerzy Giedroyc turned down the order in 1994 to protest the sitting government.

==== Volodymyr Zelenskyy, Leonid Kuchma, Viktor Yushchenko and Petro Poroshenko ====
On 19 June 2026, the Polish President Karol Nawrocki stripped the Order of the White Eagle from the Ukrainian President Volodymyr Zelenskyy after Zelenskyy gave a Ukrainian military unit an honorary title referencing the Ukrainian Insurgent Army. Nawrocki said that "the Ukrainian Insurgent Army (UPA) remains, above all, a formation responsible for the brutal crimes committed against citizens of the Republic of Poland during World War II (...) We must not allow the spreading of ideologies responsible for genocide. Just as we reject the symbols of German Nazism and Soviet communism, we must reject the cult of the perpetrators of the Volhynia massacre. There is no place in Polish public life for red–and–black Bandera flags.". In solidarity with Zelenskyy, three former Ukrainian presidents Leonid Kuchma, Viktor Yushchenko, and Petro Poroshenko voluntarily renounced and returned their Orders of the White Eagle to Poland.

== Insignia ==
=== 1713 ===
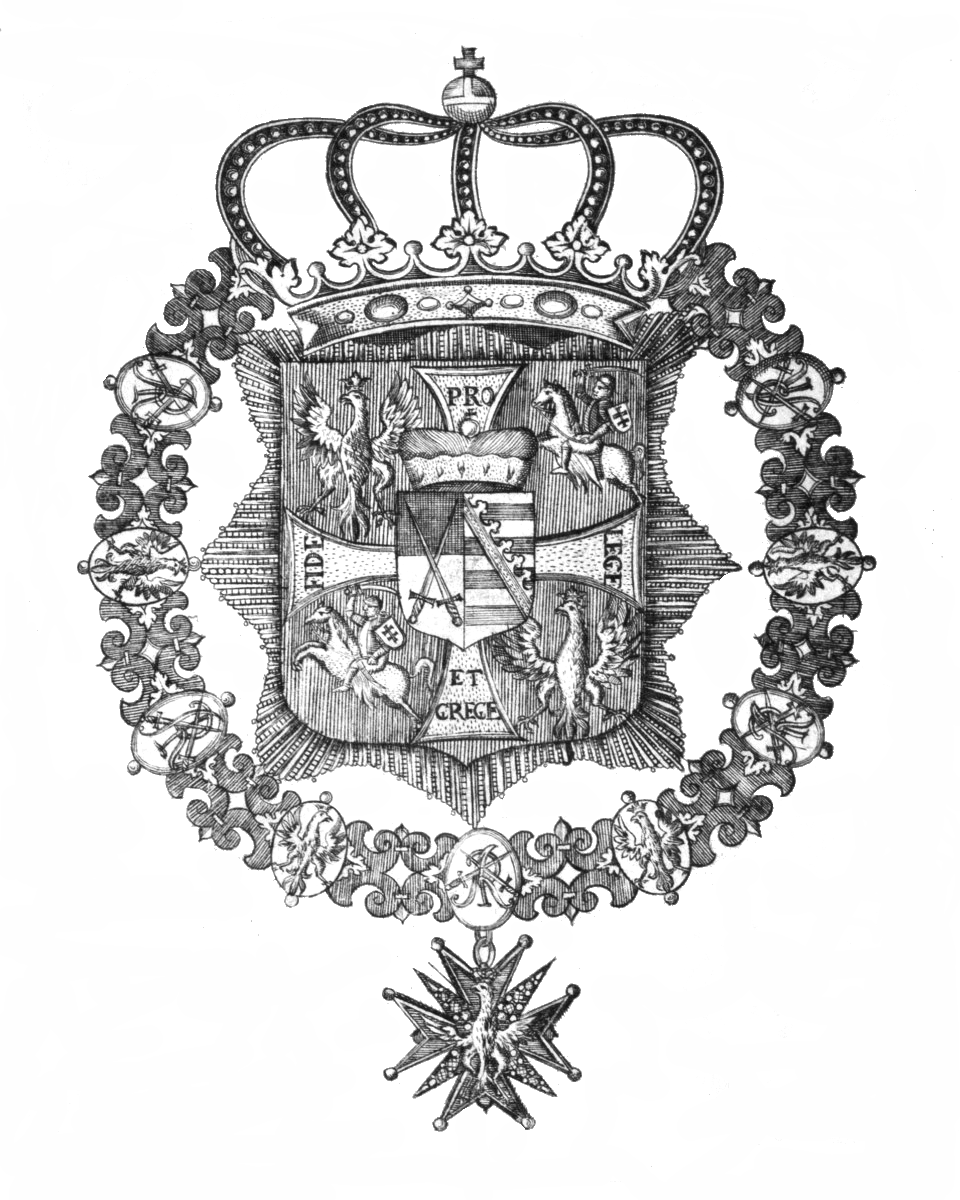
Royal Star of Order of the White Eagle of Augustus II the Strong before 1730

The 1713 badge was a Maltese cross enameled red with white borders with diamonds set in each of the balls at the eight points of the cross and with diamond set rays appearing between each of the points of the cross, i.e., a larger longer ray between each arm of the cross and a smaller ray between each of the two points of these arms. In the centre of the cross was a white enamelled eagle in high relief with spread wings and facing left and with a diamond set royal crown on its head. At the top of the cross between the two top points was a diamond studded semi-circular link through which passed a diamond studded ring through which, in turn, passed the light-blue ribbon from which it was worn. The reverse side of this Maltese cross was enamelled white with red borders and had at its center an oval gold medallion with the founder's crowned royal cypher above two crossed swords taken from his arms as the Arch-Marshall of the Holy Roman Empire.

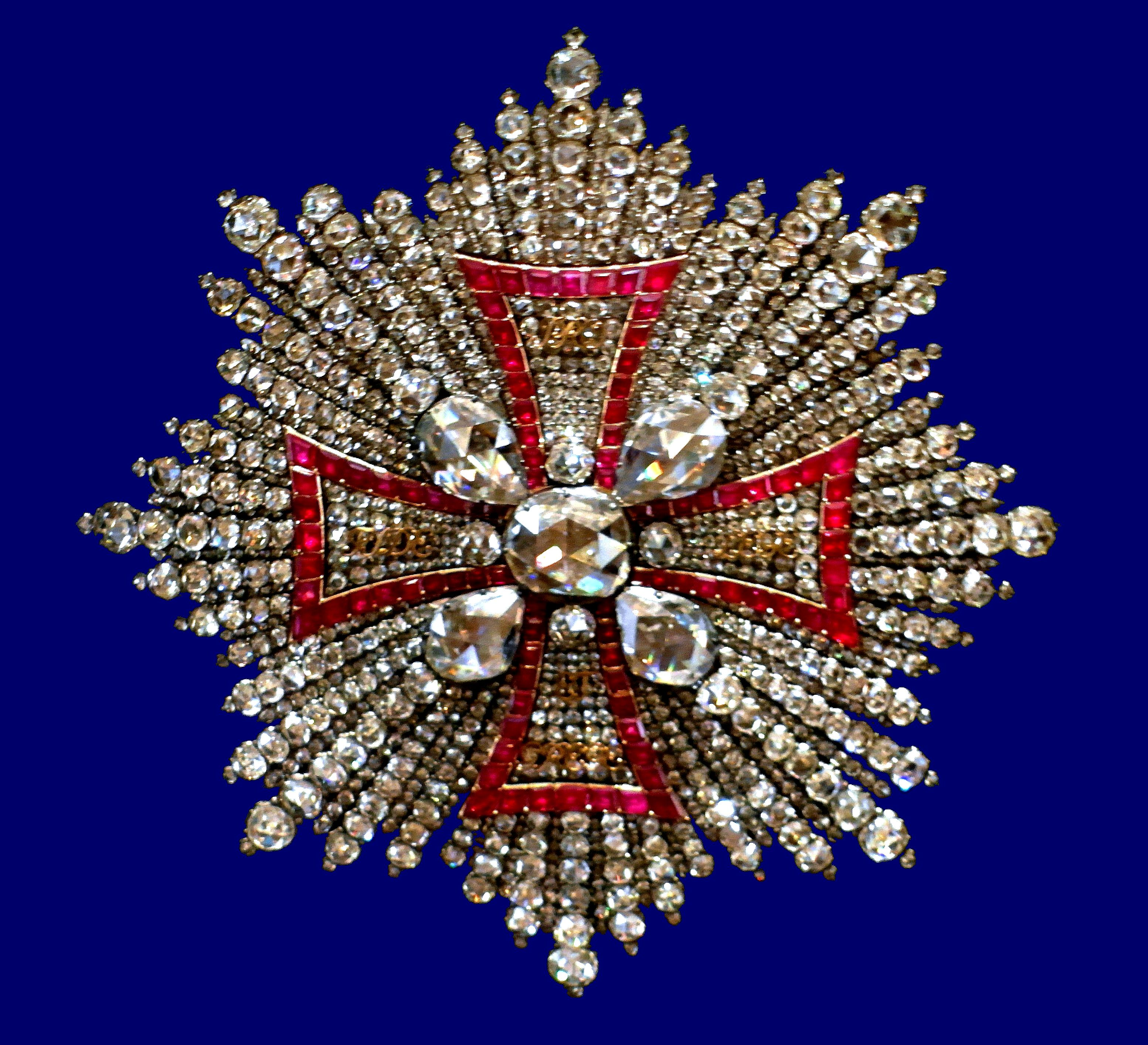
Diamond star belonging to King Augustus the Strong of Poland-Saxony

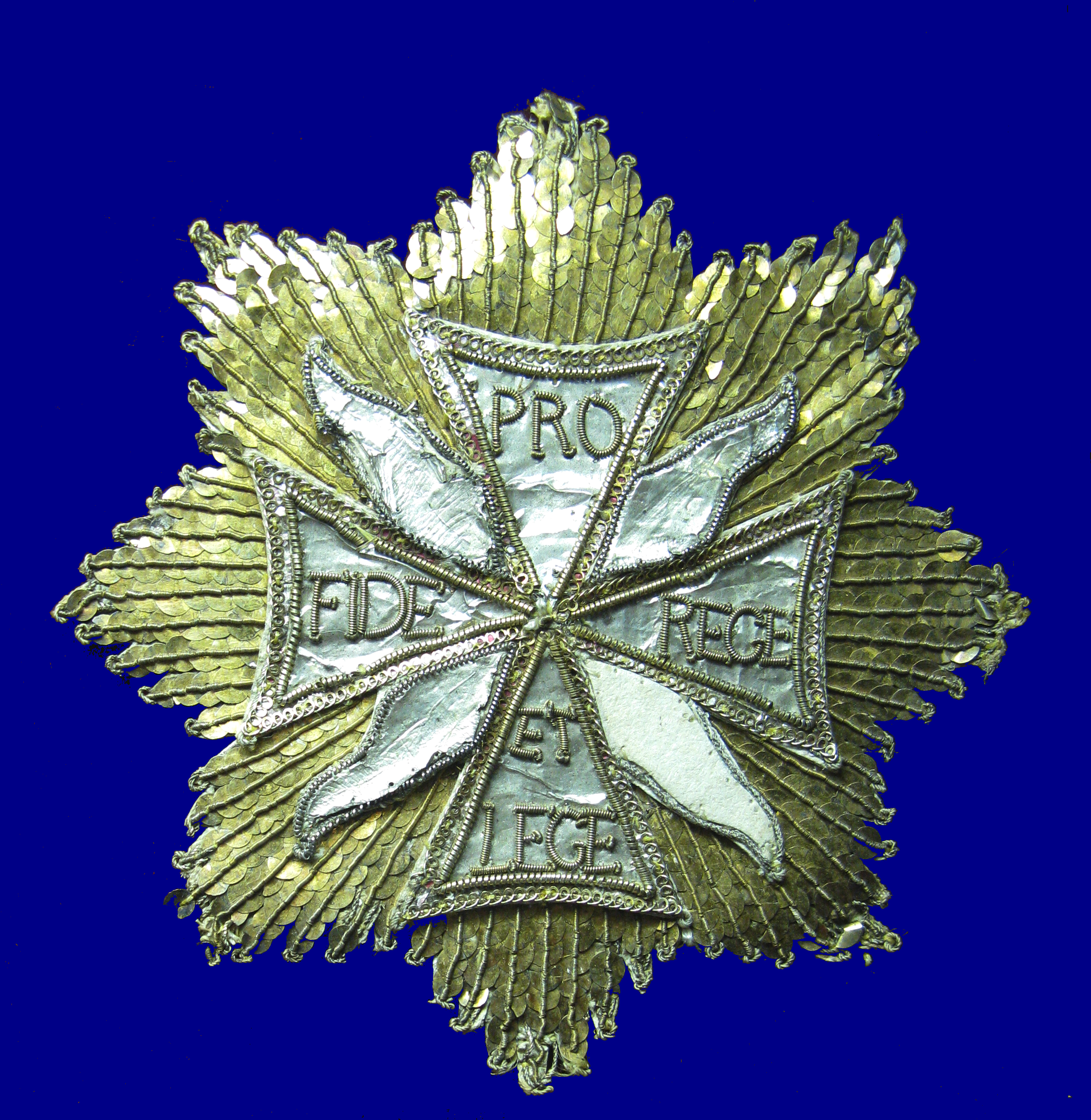
"Plaque" (Star) of the Order, 18th century

The star of the order consisted of an eight-pointed gold star with straight rays which bore a red-bordered white enamelled cross pattée with golden rays between the arms and with a golden rosette at its centre. The arms of this cross pattée bore the motto "Pro Fide, Lege et Rege" (For Faith, Law and the King) in golden letters.

The King of Poland could also wear the cross from a collar of 24 alternating links of white enameled eagles, crowned and holding scepters and orbs, and dark blue enameled ovals, surrounded by gold rays, bearing alternatively full-length enamelled images of the Virgin Mary crowned, dressed in pink and pale blue and supporting the Christ Child on her left arm and holding a gold scepter in her right hand and the letters of her name, "MARIA", arranged into a stylized monogram in white enamel. This collar was made for the coronation of Stanisław II Augustus, the last King of Poland, but the coat of arms of the founder, Augustus the Strong, show the cross of the Order hanging from a collar of a very different design.

=== During the Partitions ===
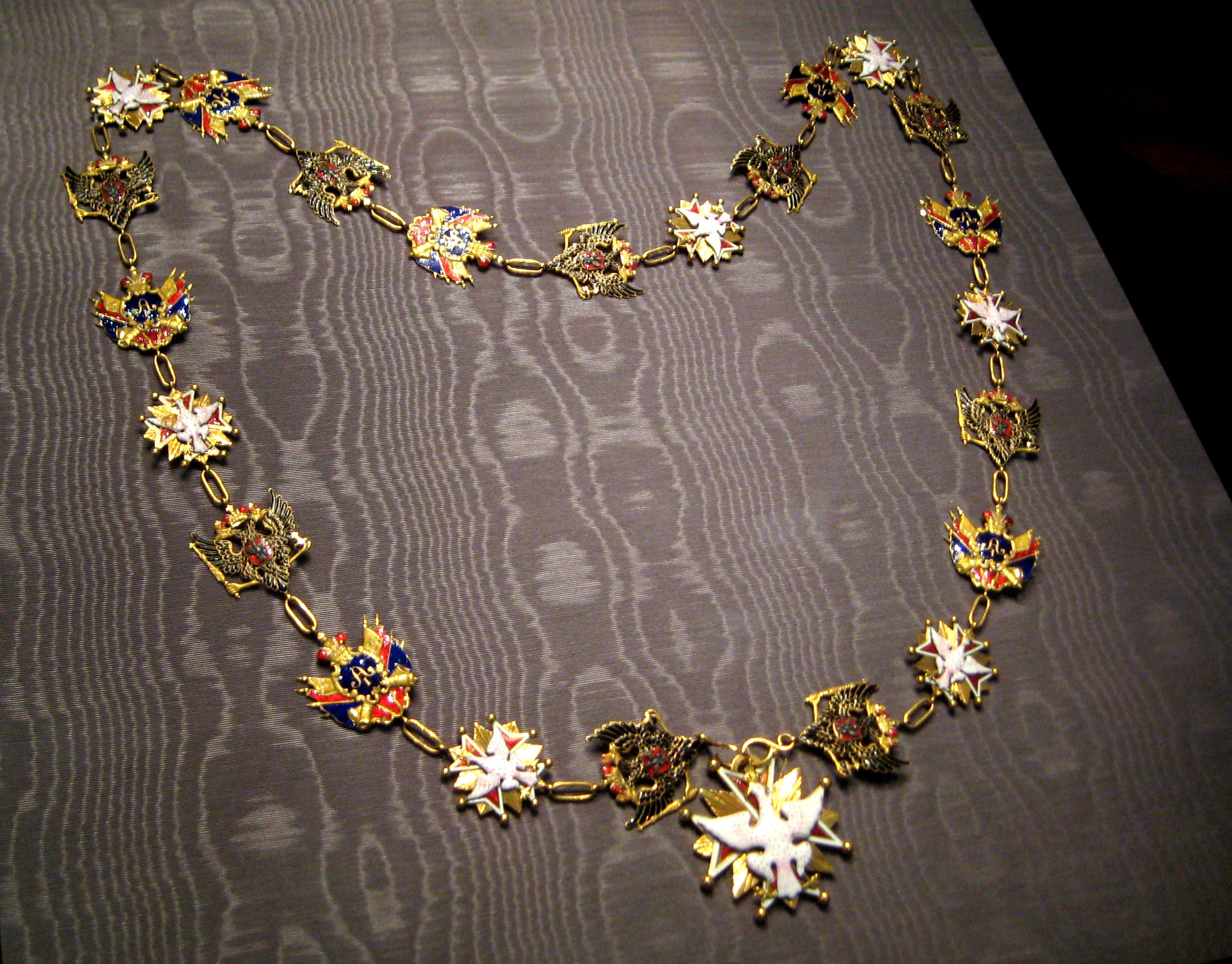
Collar of the Order of the White Eagle

The badge of the order consisted of a gold crowned double-headed eagle enamelled in black, with a cross superimposed upon its chest: this was a gold Maltese cross enamelled in red with white enamel outline and golden rays between the arms. A white enamel crowned eagle with spread wings, facing left (the coat-of-arms of Poland) was superimposed on the cross. On its reverse side the double-headed eagle bore in the center of its back a diminutive red-bordered white-enamelled cross pattée with a gold rosette at its center gold rays between its arms. The black double-headed eagle hung by its two crowned heads from an enamelled Russian imperial crown, which, in turn, hung from a dark blue silk moire ribbon.

The star of the order consisted of an eight-pointed gold star with straight rays; the central golden disc bore a red-bordered white enamelled cross pattée with a golden rosette at its center and golden rays between the arms, surrounded by a blue enamel ring bearing the motto "Pro Fide, Lege et Rege" (For Faith, Law and the King).

=== After 1921 ===
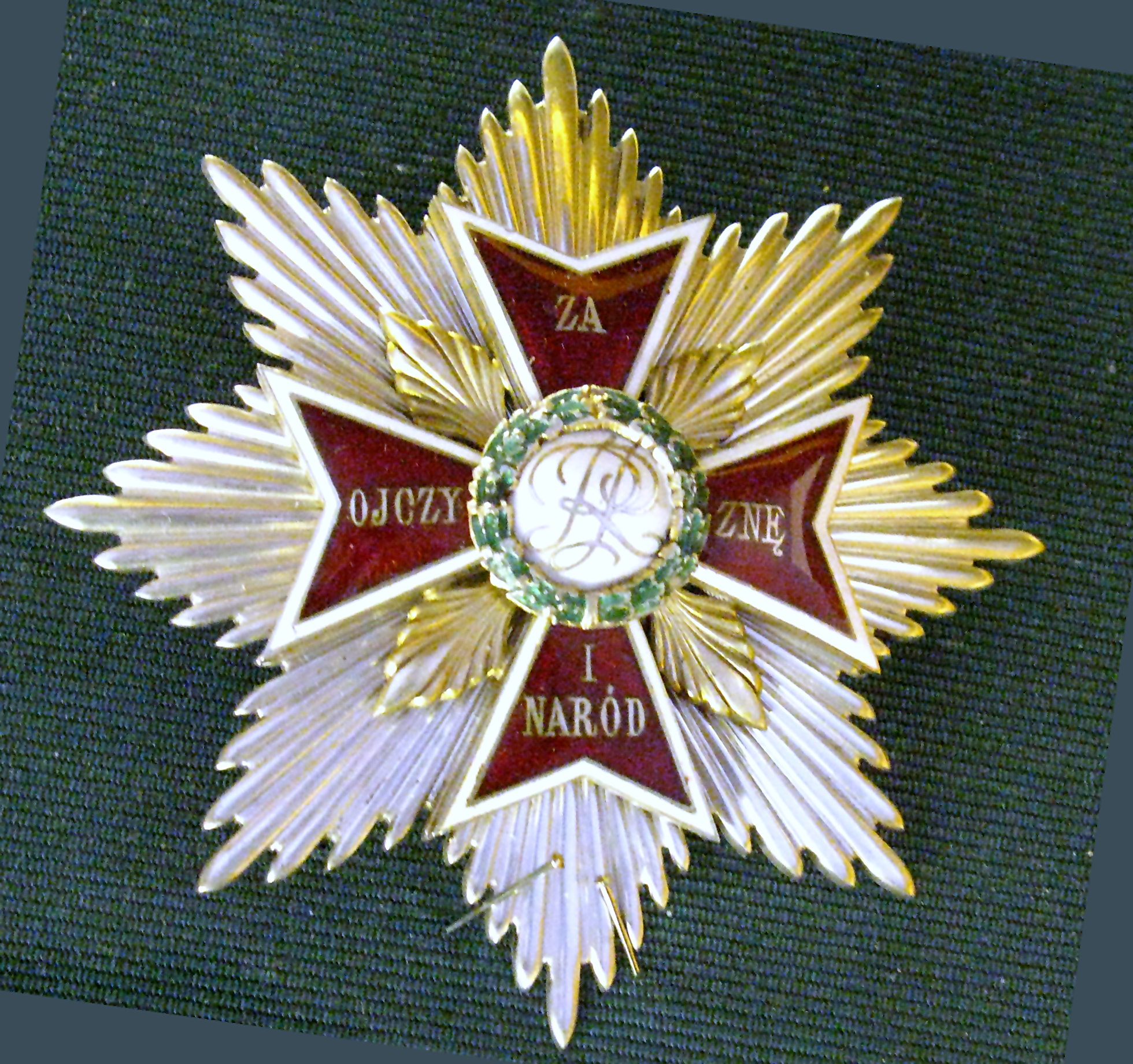
Star of the modern order

The badge of the order consists of a gold Maltese cross enamelled in red with white enamel outline and with golden palmette-like rays between the arms. A white enamel crowned eagle with spread wings, facing left (the coat-of-arms of Poland) is superimposed on the cross. It is worn on a plain light blue sash. This design clearly reflects a return to the essential design of the 1713 badge, but without the diamonds of the earlier badge. The reverse side of the badge bears the same Maltese Cross with golden rays as the front side and this cross bears the same design as that of the star of the order (see below), except that the arms of the cross are not enamelled red, i.e., only the outline of the cross and its central disc with its surrounding oak wreath are enamelled. The star or plaque of the order consists of an eight-pointed silver star with straight rays, with a gold Maltese cross, enamelled in red with white enamel outline and with golden palmette-like rays between the arms, superimposed upon it. The motto of the order, "Za Ojczyznę i Naród" ("For Fatherland and Nation"), appears on the arms of the cross. The central disc is in white enamel with the monogram "RP" (Rzeczpospolita Polska) surrounded by a green enamelled oak wreath.

== Recipients of the Order ==
The following lists some of those invested with the Order, in recognition of significant service to Poland, whether military or civilian.

=== Poland ===
A

- Władysław Anders

B

- Leszek Balcerowicz
- Oswald Balzer
- Władysław Bartoszewski
- Józef Beck
- Franciszek Blachnicki
- Tadeusz Bór-Komorowski
- Franciszek Ksawery Branicki
- Jan Klemens Branicki

C

- Mirosław Chojecki
- Joachim Chreptowicz
- Wiesław Chrzanowski
- Marie Skłodowska Curie
- Celestyn Czaplic
- Franciszek Stanisław Hutten-Czapski
- Adam Kazimierz Czartoryski
- August Aleksander Czartoryski
- Kazimierz Czartoryski
- Michał Fryderyk Czartoryski

D

- Marcin Danielewicz
- Stanisław Ernest Denhoff
- Ludwik Dorn
- Andrzej Duda (ex officio)
- Ignacy Działyński

E

- Marek Edelman

F

- Andrei Yakovlevich
- Emil August Fieldorf
- Jerzy Detloff Fleming

G

- Stefan Garczynski
- Ivan Gašparovič
- Stanisław Gebhardt
- Bronisław Geremek
- Henryk Mikołaj Górecki
- Władysław Grabski
- Franciszek Grocholski
- Andrzej Gwiazda

H

- Józef Haller
- Michał Heller
- Zbigniew Herbert
- Gustaw Herling-Grudziński

J

- Antoni Barnaba Jabłonowski
- Pope John Paul II

K

- Ryszard Kaczorowski (ex officio)
- Lech Kaczyński (ex officio)
- Jan Karski
- Lane Kirkland
- Leszek Kołakowski
- Hugo Kołłątaj
- Bronisław Komorowski (ex officio)
- Wojciech Korfanty
- Józef Dominik Kossakowski
- Ignacy Krasicki
- Kazimierz Krasiński
- Jacek Kuroń
- Aleksander Kwaśniewski (ex officio)
- Eugeniusz Kwiatkowski

L

- Stanisław Lem
- Herman Lieberman
- Jan Józef Lipski
- Antoni Benedykt Lubomirski
- Franciszek Ferdynant Lubomirski
- Hieronim Augustyn Lubomirski
- Stanisław Lubomirski (1704–1793)
- Stanisław Lubomirski (1722–1782)
- Kazimierz Łukomski (1920–1991 Polish Airborne World War II)
- Witold Lutosławski

M

- Adam Macedoński
- Stanisław Maczek
- Lech Majewski
- Jan Małachowski
- Stanisław Małachowski
- Ivan Mazepa (Jan Mazepa-Kołodyński)
- Andrzej Mokronowski
- Ignacy Mościcki (ex officio)

N

- Konstantin Nikolayevich, Grand Duke of Russia
- Jan Nowak-Jeziorański
- Karol Nawrocki (ex officio)

O

- Grzegorz Antoni Ogiński
- Tadeusz Franciszek Ogiński
- Franciszek Maksymilian Ossoliński
- Stanisław Ostrowski (ex officio)
- Gabriel Narutowicz (ex officio)

P

- Krzysztof Penderecki
- Franciszek Pieczka
- Witold Pilecki
- Aleksandra Piłsudska
- Józef Piłsudski (ex officio)
- Ryszard Piotrowski
- Andrzej Poczobut
- Andrzej Poniatowski
- Kazimierz Poniatowski
- Michał Jerzy Poniatowski
- Stanisław Poniatowski (1676–1762)
- Stanisław August Poniatowski (1732–1798)
- Stanisław Poniatowski (1754–1833)
- Jerzy Popiełuszko
- Zofia Posmysz
- Aleksander Stanisław Potocki
- Franciszek Salezy Potocki
- Roman Ignacy Potocki
- Stanisław Kostka Potocki
- Stanisław Szczęsny Potocki

R

- Władysław Raczkiewicz (ex officio)
- Edward Raczyński (1891–1993)
- Antoni Radziwiłł
- Hieronim Wincenty Radziwiłł
- Józef Mikołaj Radziwiłł
- Karol Stanisław "Panie Kochanku" Radziwiłł
- Karol Stanisław Radziwiłł (1669–1719)
- Maciej Radziwiłł
- Michał Hieronim Radziwiłł
- Michał Kazimierz "Rybeńko" Radziwiłł
- Wojciech Roszkowski
- Stefan Rowecki
- Edward Rydz-Śmigły
- Stanisław Ferdynand Rzewuski
- Wacław Rzewuski

S

- Kazimierz Sabbat (ex officio)
- Jacek Salij
- Adam Stefan Sapieha
- Kazimierz Nestor Sapieha
- Irena Sendler
- Władysław Sikorski
- Ignacy Skorupka
- Józef Skumin
- Walery Sławek
- Stanisław Sosabowski
- Baruch Steinberg
- Adam Strzembosz
- Alexander Suvorov
- Wisława Szymborska

T

- Józef Tischner

W

- Andrzej Wajda
- Anna Walentynowicz
- Lech Wałęsa (ex officio)
- Andrzej Wielowieyski
- Wincenty Witos
- Stanisław Wojciechowski (ex officio)
- Henryk Wujec
- Stefan Wyszyński

Z

- August Zaleski (ex officio)
- Marian Zembala
- Zygmunt Zieliński

=== Foreign ===
A

- Abdullah II of Jordan
- Abdullah of Saudi Arabia
- Edward Fenech Adami
- Valdas Adamkus
- János Áder
- Martti Ahtisaari
- Akihito
- Albert I
- Albert II

B

- Traian Basescu
- Beatrix of the Netherlands
- Boris III, Tsar of Bulgaria
- Algirdas Brazauskas

C

- Fernando Henrique Cardoso
- Carl XVI Gustaf
- Jacques Chirac
- Carlo Azeglio Ciampi

D

- Norman Davies
- Karl Dedecius
- Gaston Doumergue
- Henrik Jakob von Düben

E

- Elizabeth II

F

- Ferdinand Foch
- Giustino Fortunato
- Vaira Vīķe-Freiberga

G

- Pietro Gasparri
- Árpád Göncz
- Dalia Grybauskaitė

H

- Haakon VII of Norway
- Tarja Halonen
- Franz Josef von Hallwyl
- Harald V, King of Norway
- William Neville Hart
- Václav Havel
- Hirohito
- Francois Hollande
- Henri of Luxembourg

I

- Ion Iliescu
- Toomas Hendrik Ilves

J

- Jacob Bruce (one of the chief associates of Peter the Great)
- Joseph Joffre
- Juan Carlos I of Spain

K

- Alar Karis
- Amanullah Khan, King of Afghanistan
- Mauno Koivisto
- Václav Klaus
- Robert Kocharyan
- Helmut Kohl
- Horst Köhler
- Milan Kučan
- Leonid Kuchma (returned)

L

- Johan Laidoner
- Albert Lebrun
- Henri Le Rond
- Peter Lacy

M

- Michael I of Romania
- Queen Máxima of the Netherlands
- Queen Mathilde of Belgium
- Ferenc Mádl
- Tomáš Masaryk
- Benito Mussolini
- Cardinal Désiré-Joseph Mercier
- Lennart Meri
- Alexandre Millerand
- Roh Moo-hyun
- Sergio Mattarella

N

- Napoleon I
- Nursultan Nazarbayev
- Giorgio Napolitano
- Sauli Niinistö
- Karl Nesselrode
- Gitanas Nausėda

O

- Bohdan Osadchuk

P

- Queen Paola of Belgium
- Konstantin Päts
- Stevo Pendarovski
- Philippe Petain
- Philippe of Belgium
- Pope Pius XI
- Raymond Poincaré
- Petro Poroshenko (returned)

R

- Johannes Rau
- Ronald Reagan
- Lauri Relander
- Reza Shah
- Arnold Rüütel

S

- Jorge Sampaio
- Michiko Shoda
- Rudolf Schuster
- Gerhard Schröder
- Haile Selassie I of Ethiopia
- Aníbal Cavaco Silva
- Queen Silvia of Sweden
- László Sólyom
- Queen Sonja of Norway
- Pehr Svinhufvud

V

- Victor Emanuel III

W

- King Willem-Alexander of the Netherlands
- Woodrow Wilson

Y

- Emperor Yoshihito
- Viktor Yushchenko (returned)
- Yoon Suk Yeol

Z

- Volodymyr Zelenskyy (revoked)
- Miloš Zeman

== See also ==
- Polish military eagle
- 2019 Dresden heist
- Orders, decorations, and medals of Poland
- Order of the Pahonia
