= Unofficial mottos of Poland =

Poland has no official motto of the State, namely the one which is recognised as such by the Polish national law.

However, there are some common phrases which appear commonly on banners, flags and other symbols of the Polish State, or are considered commonly as the symbols of Poland.

- Jeszcze Polska nie zginęła ("Poland is not yet lost") – the first line of the Polish national anthem.
- Bóg, Honor, Ojczyzna ("God, Honor, Fatherland"): the most common phrase found on Polish military standards.
- Za wolność naszą i waszą ("For our freedom and yours"): Its history dates back to the times when Polish soldiers, exiled from the partitioned Poland, fought in the various independence movements throughout the world. Media related to Za wolność naszą i waszą at Wikimedia Commons.
- Żywią i bronią (ancient spelling: Żywią y bronią, "They Feed and Defend") found on the military standards of the Kościuszko Insurrection and Bataliony Chłopskie, a motto of the Polish patriotic peasant movement and peasant (people's) parties.
- Pro Fide, Lege et Rege ("For Faith, Law, and King"): motto of the Polish-Lithuanian Commonwealth during the 18th century and the Order of the White Eagle.
- Nic o nas, bez nas ("Nothing about us, without us"): Derives from the title of the Nihil novi Constitution of 1505, which established nobles' democracy in the Polish-Lithuanian Commonwealth. In a modern context, it can also signify frustration at Poland's fate being determined by foreign powers since the end of the 18th century. That is, the partitions and the Congress of Vienna, as well as, the Western Betrayal.
- Proletariusze wszystkich krajów, łączcie się! ("Workers of the world, unite!"): Served as an unofficial, de facto motto of the Soviet-backed Polish People's Republic ruled by the Polish United Workers' Party from 1952 to 1990.
- Żeby Polska była Polską ("Let Poland be Poland"): a song written in 1976 by Jan Pietrzak. The song was regarded as an expression of the struggle against communist rule in Poland and support for the "Solidarity" movement in the 1980s. English translation of the title song is often quoted in various speeches. Queen Elizabeth II herself delivered this statement in Polish in a speech cementing the re-establishment of Anglo-Polish friendship after the end of communism.
- Nie ma wolności bez Solidarności ("There is no freedom without solidarity") – one of the mottos of the strikes of 1980 in Gdańsk and throughout Poland, subsequently taken over by the Solidarność (Solidarity) Independent Self-Governing Trade Union, and Solidarity social movement.
