= God, Honour, Fatherland =

Unofficial motto of Poland

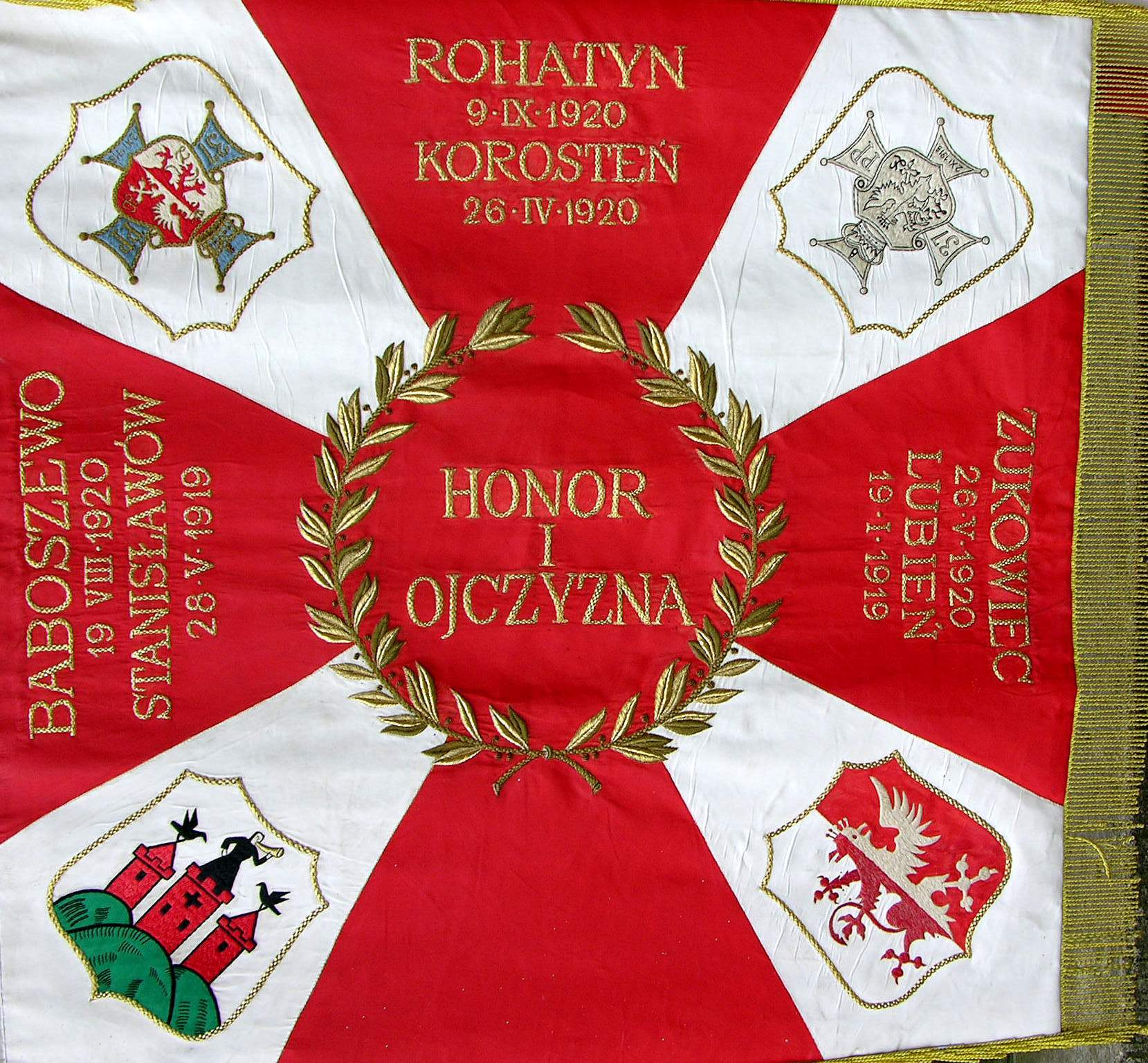
"Honor i Ojczyzna" motto as seen on a military banner of an interwar Polish military unit, the 37th Infantry Regiment.

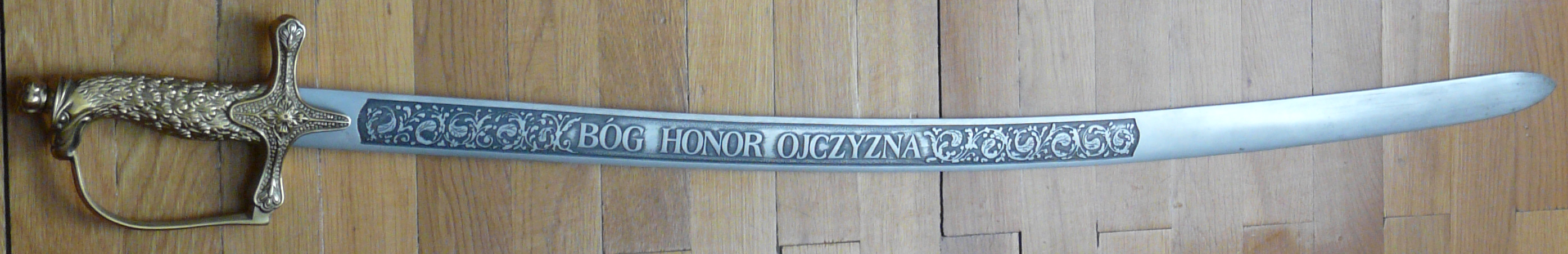
"Bóg, Honor, Ojczyzna" motto as seen on a decorative szabla.

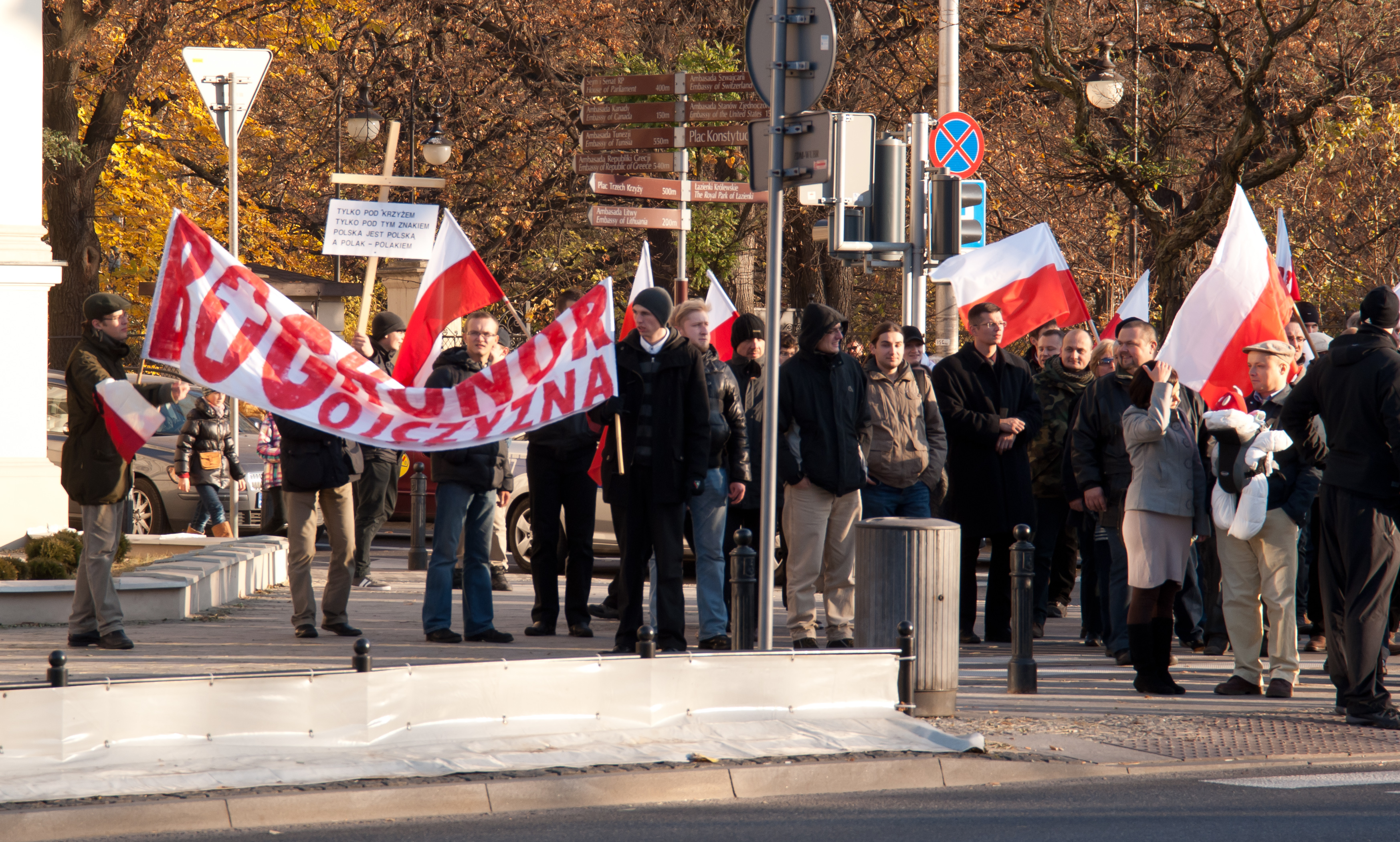
"Bóg, Honor, Ojczyzna" motto on a banner carried by participants of the Polish Day of Independence celebrations in 2011.

God, Honour, Fatherland (Note: Polish language term ojczyzna directly translates as Fatherland, but it is also occasionally translated as Motherland, thus leading to the rendering of this motto in English as "God, Honor and Motherland". See for example the translation as used in Wierzbicka (1992).) or Honour and Fatherland (Polish: Bóg, Honor, Ojczyzna or Honor i Ojczyzna) is one of the unofficial mottos of Poland. It is commonly seen as the motto of the military of Poland, and has been confirmed as such by several Polish legal decrees.

== History ==
The phrase "Honour and Fatherland" can be traced to the slogans and banners of Polish revolutionaries of the 19th century, fighting to regain Polish independence following the partitions of Poland. This is also the motto of the French Legion of Honour, instituted by Napoleon in 1802. It is likely that the phrase was brought to Poland by the soldiers of the Napoleonic-era Polish legions. It was introduced as phrase to be used on the banners of the newly reconstituted Polish military of the Second Polish Republic in 1919. The word God was officially added to the standards, preceding words Honour and Fatherland, by the decree of the Polish government-in-exile in 1943. This decree remained in force till it was changed by the communist government of the People's Republic of Poland in 1955 to "For Our Fatherland the People's Republic of Poland" ("Za naszą Ojczyznę Polską Rzeczpospolitą Ludową"). Following the fall of communism, the "God, Honour, Fatherland" phrase was restored by the government of the Third Polish Republic in 1993. Since 2018, the phrase appears on the Polish passport.

== Significance ==
The motto is interpreted as reconfirming the Constitution of Poland's clause about the citizen's duty to serve the Fatherland (ojczyzna), with the social contract allowing exceptions honour and faith (Ojczyźnie wszystko, prócz miłości Boga najwyższego i Honoru). It is one of the symbols connecting Polish patriotism to (Catholic) religiosity.

== See also ==
- For our freedom and yours ("Za wolność Waszą i Naszą")
