= Deputy cup-bearer =

Deputy cup-bearer (Polish: Podczaszy, Lithuanian: Pataurininkis) was since the 13th century a court office in Poland and later in Lithuania. Deputy cup-bearer was the deputy of the cup-bearer, but at the time was more important than his superior.

Since the 14th–16th century an honorable court title and a district office in Crown of Poland and Grand Duchy of Lithuania, and later Polish–Lithuanian Commonwealth.

- podczaszy wielki koronny – Great Royal Deputy Cup-bearer of the Crown
- podczaszy wielki litewski – Great Royal Deputy Cup-bearer of Lithuania
- podczaszy koronny – Royal Deputy Cup-bearer of the Crown
- podczaszy litewski – Royal Deputy Cup-bearer of Lithuania
- podczaszy ziemski – District Royal Deputy Cup-bearer

== See also ==
- Offices in the Polish–Lithuanian Commonwealth
