= Wojski =

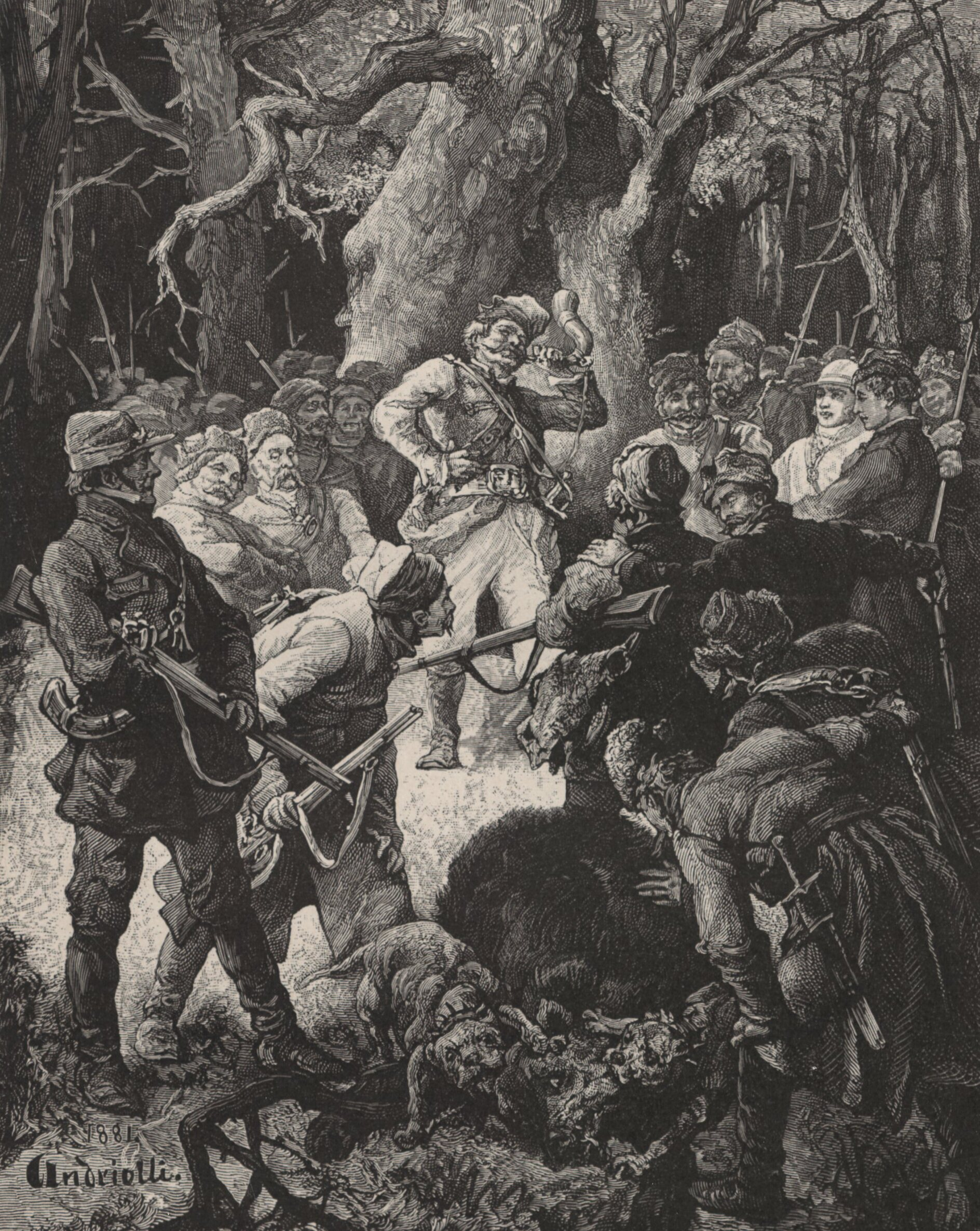
Wojski Hreczecha from Pan Tadeusz)

A wojski (Lithuanian: Vaiskis; Medieval Latin: tribunus, hence sometimes rendered into English as tribune) was an officer in medieval Poland and later in Lithuania, responsible for the security of voivodeships or districts at times when voivods and castellans had accompanied the szlachta (nobility) to war.

With time, the wojski's responsibilities were taken over by starostas, and wojski became an honorary district office in the Polish–Lithuanian Commonwealth.

- Wojski koronny - Crown Wojski
- Wojski litewski (Lithuanian: Lietuvos vaiskis) - Lithuanian Wojski
- Wojski większy - Major Wojski
- Wojski mniejszy - Minor Wojski
- Wojski grodzki - City Wojski
- Wojski zamkowy - Castle Wojski
