= Podstoli =

Courtly duty in Poland and Lithuania

Deputy pantler (Lithuanian: pastalininkis, Polish: podstoli) was a court office in Poland and Lithuania. They were the deputies of a pantler, and was responsible for the King's and Grand Duke's pantry.

From the 14th century, this was an honorary court title and a district office in Crown of Poland and Grand Duchy of Lithuania, and later in Polish–Lithuanian Commonwealth.

- Podstoli wielki koronny - Crown Great Deputy Master of the Pantry
- Podstoli wielki litewski - Lithuanian Great Deputy Master of the Pantry
- Podstoli koronny - Crown Deputy Master of the Pantry
- Podstoli litewski - Lithuanian Deputy Master of the Pantry
- Podstoli nadworny koronny - Crown Deputy Court Master of the Pantry
- Podstoli nadworny litewski - Lithuanian Deputy Court Master of the Pantry
- Podstoli ziemski - District Master of the Pantry

== See also ==
- Pan Podstoli, a novel by Ignacy Krasicki
- Stavilac
