= Master of the hunt (Polish–Lithuanian Commonwealth) =

Master of the hunt (Polish: łowczy; Lithuanian: medžioklis; Latin: venator) was a Polish royal court official from the 13th century with responsibility for organising hunts and guarding royal forests against poachers. Masters of the Hunt also served at the regional courts of magnates in various provinces.

From the 15th century, "Master of the Hunt" was an honorary court title and a district office in the Kingdom of Poland and in the Grand Duchy of Lithuania, and later in the Polish–Lithuanian Commonwealth.

- Łowczy wielki koronny - Crown Grand Master of the Hunt
- Łowczy wielki litewski - Lithuanian Grand Master of the Hunt
- Łowczy wojewódzki - Voivodship Master of the Hunt
- Łowczy ziemski - District Master of the Hunt
- Łowczy nadworny - Court Master of the Hunt
- Podłowczy - Deputy Master of the Hunt

== Inherited and marital hunting titles ==
The children of hunt masters were entitled to carry on in the paternal office. In the case of sons they would be termed, łowczyc. In the case of daughters, the equivalent title was łowczanka. The wife of a Łowczy had the right to call herself, łowczyna.
