= List of mannerist structures in Central Poland =

The mannerist architecture and sculpture in Poland have two major traditions: Polish-Italian and Dutch-Flemish, that dominated in northern Poland. The Silesian mannerism of South-Western Poland was largely influenced by Bohemian and German mannerism, while the Pomeranian mannerism of North-Western Poland was influenced by Gothic tradition and Northern German mannerism. The Jews in Poland adapted patterns of Italian and Polish mannerism to their own tradition. The mannerist complex of Kalwaria Zebrzydowska and mannerist City of Zamość are UNESCO World Heritage Sites.

Lublin region created its own style with folk motives (Kazimierz Dolny), while the urban mannerism in Greater Poland replaced the Gothic gables with Italian style arcades, tympanums, friezes and pillars in tuscan order (Poznań). Warsaw, as one of the main cities of the Polish-Lithuanian Commonwealth and due to its role as seat of Parliament and King, was a place of meetings of cultures. The mannerist architecture in the city was a combination of many types of mannerist traditions.

The Bohemian mannerism had also large influence on the architecture and sculpture in Poland. This concerned not only the lands that were part of the Kingdom of Bohemia, like Silesia. Bohemian mannerism in Silesia joined the Prague renaissance with its brunelleschian arcades (inspired by Queen Anna Jagiellon's Belvedere in Prague, 1535–1537) and German influences originating from the late Gothic (steep gable with renaissance decoration).

== Greater Poland Voivodeship ==
Place	Building	Date of construction	Style and history	Image
Grodzisk Wielkopolski	Church of St. Jadwiga of Silesia	1640	Polish mannerism (architect Krzysztof Bonadura the Elder). The original 15th-century Gothic church was enlarged and rebuilt in mannerist style at initiative of Jan Opaliński, voivode of Poznań and his son Aleksander. During the reconstruction the presbytery was covered by a polygonal dome carried on a drum and four side chapels were added to the transept. The domed chapels with lanterns were modelled after the Sigismund's Chapel.	
Poznań	City Hall	1550–1567	Italian/Polish mannerism (architect Giovanni Battista di Quadro). The town hall was built during the turn of the 13th and 14th centuries. In the 16th century the building was enhanced, roofs were covered with attics and facade was embellished with a three-story loggia.	
Poznań	Poznań Cathedral - Tomb of bishop Goślicki	after 1607	Polish mannerism. It was established for Wawrzyniec Goślicki, bishop of Poznań by his heirs. The tomb monument, situated in St. Martin's Chapel, was made of black and red marble. The deceased was depicted sleeping under canopy supported by two angels. It was modelled after the neighbouring Konarski's tomb monument by Canavesi.	
Poznań	Poznań Cathedral - Tomb of bishop Izdbieński	1557–1560	Polish mannerism (sculptor Jan Michałowicz of Urzędów). It was established for Benedykt Izdbieński, bishop of Poznań by his heirs. The tomb was carved in sandstone and red marble and adorned with profuse floral decorations. Characteristic for Michałowicz blend of Flemish and Italian influences is visible in the tomb.	
Poznań	Poznań Cathedral - Tomb of bishop Konarski	1575–1576	Polish mannerism (design by Giovanni Battista di Quadro). It was established for Adam Konarski, bishop of Poznań by his heirs. The tomb was carved by Hieronim Canavesi in sandstone and red marble in tuscan order. Sculptures characterize with rough moulding of stone and simplification of details.	
Poznań	Ridt House	1576	Polish mannerism (Greater Poland type, architect Giovanni Battista di Quadro). The Gothic building was purchased in 1566 by Zachariasz Ridt, a rich cloth and leather merchant. Zachariasz, who was also a senior pastor of the Lutheran community in Poznań, rebuilt the house in mannerist style. The tuscan order, decorative features of the gable (volutes and pillars) as well as division of facade surfaces with simple details are typical for Greater Poland mannerism.	

== Lublin Voivodeship ==
Place	Building	Date of construction	Style and history	Image
Gołąb	Church of St. Catherine and St. Florian	1628–1638	Polish mannerism (circle of Santi Gucci) with elements of Dutch mannierism (ferrule ornament). The church was established by priest Szymon Grzybowski.	
Gołąb	Loreto House	1634–1642	Italian mannerism, an exact replica of the Loreto House in Italy. Founded by Chancellor Jerzy Ossoliński. The main decorating features are ceramic statues of prophets, created under strong influence of Michelangelo's works.	
Janowiec	Firlej Castle	1577–1587, beginning of the 17th century	Polish mannerism (architect Santi Gucci). Andrzej Firlej built a new representative eastern wing with arcades and mannerist attic.	
Janowiec	Church of St. Margaret	late 16th century	Polish mannerism. The original church was built in about 1350 and rebuilt for a Calvinist Andrzej Firlej, castellan of Lublin.	
Kazimierz Dolny	Celej House	before 1635	Polish mannerism (Lublin type, circle of Santi Gucci), the attic is decorated with folk motives (basilisks, dragons and birds among others) Built for a wealthy merchant Bartłomiej Celej.	
Kazimierz Dolny	Church of St. John the Baptist and St. Bartholomew	1586–1613	Polish mannerism (architect Jakub Balin). The original 14th-century building burned in 1561. The initiators of the reconstruction and the founders were the Firlejs. The church was enhanced and covered with a cradle vault with lanterns. The Gothic gables were rebuilt in the late renaissance style.	
Kazimierz Dolny	Mikołaj Przybyła Granary	1591	Polish mannerism. In the beginning of the 17th century there was about 60 granaries in the town.	
Kazimierz Dolny	Przybyła Houses	1615	Polish mannerism (Lublin type with folk motives). Built for two brothers Mikołaj and Krzysztof Przybyła.	
Krupe	Orzechowski Castle	after 1577, 1604–1608	Polish mannerism. The castle was constructed for an arian Paweł Orzechowski starting from the original Krupski mansion. It was built as a fortified palace and decorated with attics. Facades were adorned with sgraffitos and cordon cornices.	
Lublin	Carmelite Church	1635–1644	Polish mannerism (Lublin type). The church was founded by Katarzyna z Kretków Sanguszkowa for Discalced Carmelite Sisters. The main gabled facade was decorated with arcade-pilaster divisions and frescoes. Nave elevations were divided with pilasters supporting the console cornice.	
Lublin	Chociszewski House	first half of the 17th century	Polish mannerism (Lublin type). The original house of Stefan z Wilczyna, canon of Chełm from the beginning of the 16th century, was rebuilt probably for the Chociszewski Family. They purchased the house in 1630 under appropriation to keep a wine warehouse and a pharmacy. Richly decorated attic was added at that time.	
Lublin	Dominican Church	1575	Polish mannerism (Lublin type). After the fire in 1575 the Gothic church (built in 1342) was covered with a mannerist cradle vault with lanterns, and the original 14th-century gable was adorned in late renaissance style.	
Lublin	Dominican Church - Ossoliński Chapel	1624	Polish mannerism (Lublin type). The chapel was established by Katarzyna Ossolińska. It was covered with a cradle vault with lantern and adorned with mannerist stucco decorations (winged angels, leaf wreaths).	
Lublin	Konopnica House	1575	Polish mannerism. The original late Gothic house (built before 1512) was obtained by Sebastian Konopnica as a dowry of his wife Katarzyna z Kretków. Konopnica, city mayor of Lublin, rebuilt the house in mannerist style. Rich decorations of windows with medallions bearing effigies of Sebastian Konopnica and his wife Katarzyna are attributed to Pińczów workshop.	
Uchanie	Church of the Assumption of Mary - Uchański Tomb	c. 1607	Polish mannerism (sculptor Santi Gucci). Established by Anny Herburtówna to commemorate herself and her husband Paweł Uchański, voivode of Bełz. Made of sandstone with marble incrustatins, adorned with profuse floral and animal decorations. The effigies of the deceased were carved in alabaster.	
Zamość	Armenian Houses No. 30-26	first half of the 17th century	Polish mannerism. No. 30 (green) - rebuilt in 1665–74 for Jan Wilczek and adorned with profuse floral-animal motives, No. 28 (dark yellow) - built in 1645–47 for Bazyli Rudomicz professor of the Zamojski Academy, No. 26 (red) - built in 1632–34 for Armenian merchant Gabriel Bartoszewicz.	
Zamość	Cathedral	1587–1637	Polish mannerism (Lublin type, architect Bernardo Morando). It was constructed as a three-nave basilica with side chapels. The main 20m high nave was covered with a cradle vault with lanterns. The naves are divided by thick corinthian pillars crowned with richly decorated entablature. Vaults were embellished with moldings (geometric, floral and figural motives).	
Zamość	Fortifications	1582–1618	Polish mannerism (architect Bernardo Morando). The construction was started by Morando and accomplished after his death (1600) by Andrea dell'Aqua, Jan Jaroszewicz and Jan Wolff.	
Zamość	House of Dymitr Grek	first half of the 17th century	Polish mannerism (lublin type). At the beginning of the 17th century the allotment belonged to Dymitr Grek. Later the brick house was built for Wojciech Wnuk, wójt of Zamość. That house was rebuilt for Gaspor Achterloni and adorned with a mannerist attic.	
Zamość	Lublin Gate	1582–1585	Polish mannerism. The facade was decorated with allegorical personification of Poland.	
Zamość	Lublin House	c. 1591	Polish mannerism. The Lublin House was built for a Greek merchant Laguda. The succeeding owner was Edwert of Lublin. Original mannerist attic preserved at the outbuilding (No. 25a).	
Zamość	Lviv Gate	1597–1599	Polish mannerism (architect Bernardo Morando). The facade was adorned with bas-relief depicting St. Thomas the Apostle (patron saint of the city) kneeling before the Christ, Zamoyski family crests and a Latin inscription.	
Zamość	Morando House	c. 1590	Polish mannerism (architect Bernardo Morando). The house was designed and built by Morando (architect of Zamość). The arcades were embellished with rustication, while the frieze above the arcades was enriched with bas-reliefs.	
Zamość	Synagogue	1610–1620	Jewish mannerism. Built for the Sephardi Jews. The interior was richly decorated with stucco in Kalisian-Lublin style. The main part was a great pray hall (11.5 x 12.2 m).	
Zamość	The house under the Madonna	1642–1657	Polish mannerism (Lublin type). One of Armenian Houses (No. 22). Built for a Lviv merchant Sołtan Sachwelowicz. The main decorating feature is a relief depicting Madonna Trampling the Dragon. This relief gave its name to the house.	
Zamość	The house under the Married Couple	c. 1634-1657	Polish mannerism (lublin type). One of Armenian Houses (No. 24). Built for an Armenian merchant Torosz. The main decorating feature is a frieze enriched with floral bas-reliefs and a molding above depicting grotesque figures of man and woman. This relief gave its name to the house.	
Zamość	Town Hall	1591–1622	Polish mannerism (architect Bernardo Morando). Between 1639-1651 it was rebuilt by Jan Jaroszewicz and Jan Wolff. The building was enlarged and enhanced by adding another storey with high mannerist attic, while the horseshoe shaped staircase is an 18th-century addition. The clock tower is 52 meters tall and consist of five levels on square and octagonal plan.	

== Lubusz Voivodeship ==
Place	Building	Date of construction	Style and history	Image
Siedlisko	Castle Gate	c. 1612	German mannerism (architect Valentin von Säbisch). The gate building was intended to house a library and an arsenal. The main decorating features are gables with volutes and a portal with rusticated masonry.	
Siedlisko	Schönaich Castle	1597–1618	German mannerism (architect Melchior Duckhardt). The original wooden castrum in Sedlscho was replaced between 1550-1560 by a brick building. It was later enlarged and reconstructed for Georg Schönaich, who also built a chapel (Protestant rood screen) with mannerist decorations.	

== Łódź Voivodeship ==
Place	Building	Date of construction	Style and history	Image
Pabianice	Manor house	1565–1571	Polish mannerism (architect Wawrzyniec Lorek). Built for canon Stanisław Dąbrowski.	
Poddębice	Grudziński Palace	1610–1617	Polish mannerism (Lublin-Kuyavian type). Built for Zygmunt Grudziński, voivode of Rawa.	

== Masovian Voivodeship ==
Place	Building	Date of construction	Style and history	Image
Drobin	Church of Our Lady of the Rosary and St. Stanisław - Kryski Tomb	1572–1576	Italian/Polish mannerism (circle of Santi Gucci). Established by Stanisław Kryski, voivode of Masovia. It depicts Stanisław's parents Paweł Kryski, his wife Anna Szreńska and their son Wojciech Kryski, chamberlain of Płock. The structure was by most accounts inspired by the tombs in the Medici Chapel in the Basilica of San Lorenzo in Florence and the tomb of Pope Julius II in San Pietro in Vincoli in Rome, designed by Michelangelo.	
Krasne	Holy Cross Church	1570–1575	Polish mannerism. Established by Franciszek Krasiński, Deputy Chancellor of the Crown and bishop of Kraków. The main facade was reconstructed in mannierism style in the beginning of the 17th century.	
Szydłowiec	Castle	1619–1629	Polish mannerism (architect Kasper Fodyga). The original castle was rebuilt in mannerist style for Albrycht Władysław Radziwiłł, castellan of Trakai. Main additions were: loggia flanked by two towers and two bastions serving as terraces on each side of the building.	
Szydłowiec	Town Hall	1602–1629	Polish mannerism (architects Kasper and Albrecht Fodyga). Elevated attic, decorated with little towers resembling bartizans, was inspired by not existing City Hall in Warsaw by Antoneo de Ralia (1580). The clock tower covered with a mannerist spire consist of five levels on square and octagonal plan.	
Warsaw	Baryczka House	1629–1633	Polish mannerism (lublin type). Originally built before 1440, it was rebuilt in the mannierist style for the king's secretary Wojciech Baryczka the Elder. The facade was embellished with an attic and richly decorated portal.	
Warsaw	Chociszewski House	1605	Polish mannerism (architect Antoneo de Galia). Originally built before 1515, it was rebuilt in the mannierist style for the furrier Nikodem Chociszewski (Kociszewski). The portal embellished with rustication is typical for many mannerist buildings in Warsaw and in Kraków (e.g. Vasa Gate, Isaac Synagogue).	
Warsaw	Houses at Kanonia Street	c. 1607-1611	Polish mannerism. Originally built in the 16th century for the canons of the St. John's Cathedral. No. 28 - rebuilt 1611, No. 26 - rebuilt after 1607, No. 24 - rebuilt in 1606 for canon Jan Chociszewski, No. 22 - rebuilt after 1607, No. 24 - rebuilt in 1611 for canon Jan Żelazowski.	
Warsaw	Jesuit Church	1609–1626	Polish mannerism (Lublin type, architect Jan Frankiewicz). The church was founded by King Sigismund III Vasa and a chamberlain Andrzej Bobola (the Old) at Piotr Skarga's initiative, in 1609.	
Warsaw	Negro House	1622–1628	Polish mannerism. The reconstruction of the Gothic house (built before 1449) in the mannierist style was started by Jana Kluga and accomplished by Jakub Gianotti, who get a special tax exemption for this undertaking from the city municipalities. The facade was adorned with two richly decorated portals and a medallion with effigy of Negro, attributed to Gucci's workshop. This sculpture gave its name to the house. One of the portals bears a mark of ownership (gmerk) with initials 'IG' of Jakub Gianotti.	
Warsaw	Queen Anna's corridor	late 16th century	Polish mannerism. The covered passage connecting the Royal Castle with the St. John's Cathedral was built for Queen Anna Jagiellon and extended in the 1620s for king Sigismund III Vasa.	
Warsaw	Royal Castle	1598–1619	Polish mannerism/early baroque (architect Giovanni Battista Trevano - his plans were probably amended by Vincenzo Scamozzi). The original castle, built between 1407–1410, was expanded for king Sigismund III Vasa by a group of Italian architects and sculptors, including Giacomo Rodondo, Paolo del Corte and Matteo Castelli.	
Warsaw	Salwator House	1632	Polish mannerism (lublin type). Built for a wealthy wine merchant Jakub Gianotti. The late renaissance attic was adorned in the 18th century with a statue of Christ the Saviour.	
Warsaw	The house under the St. Anne	1635–1637	Polish mannerism. Originally built before 1466, it was rebuilt in the mannierist style for the Mayor of the city Henryk Plumhoff (portals, sgraffito decorations).	
Warsaw	Ujazdów Castle	1624-1630s	Polish mannerism/early baroque (architect Matteo Castelli). The castle was erected for king Sigismund III Vasa as a villa suburbana (suburban villa).	

== See also ==
- List of mannerist structures in Northern Poland
- List of mannerist structures in Southern Poland
