= Mannerist architecture and sculpture in Poland =

Form of architecture popularized between 1550 and 1650 in Poland

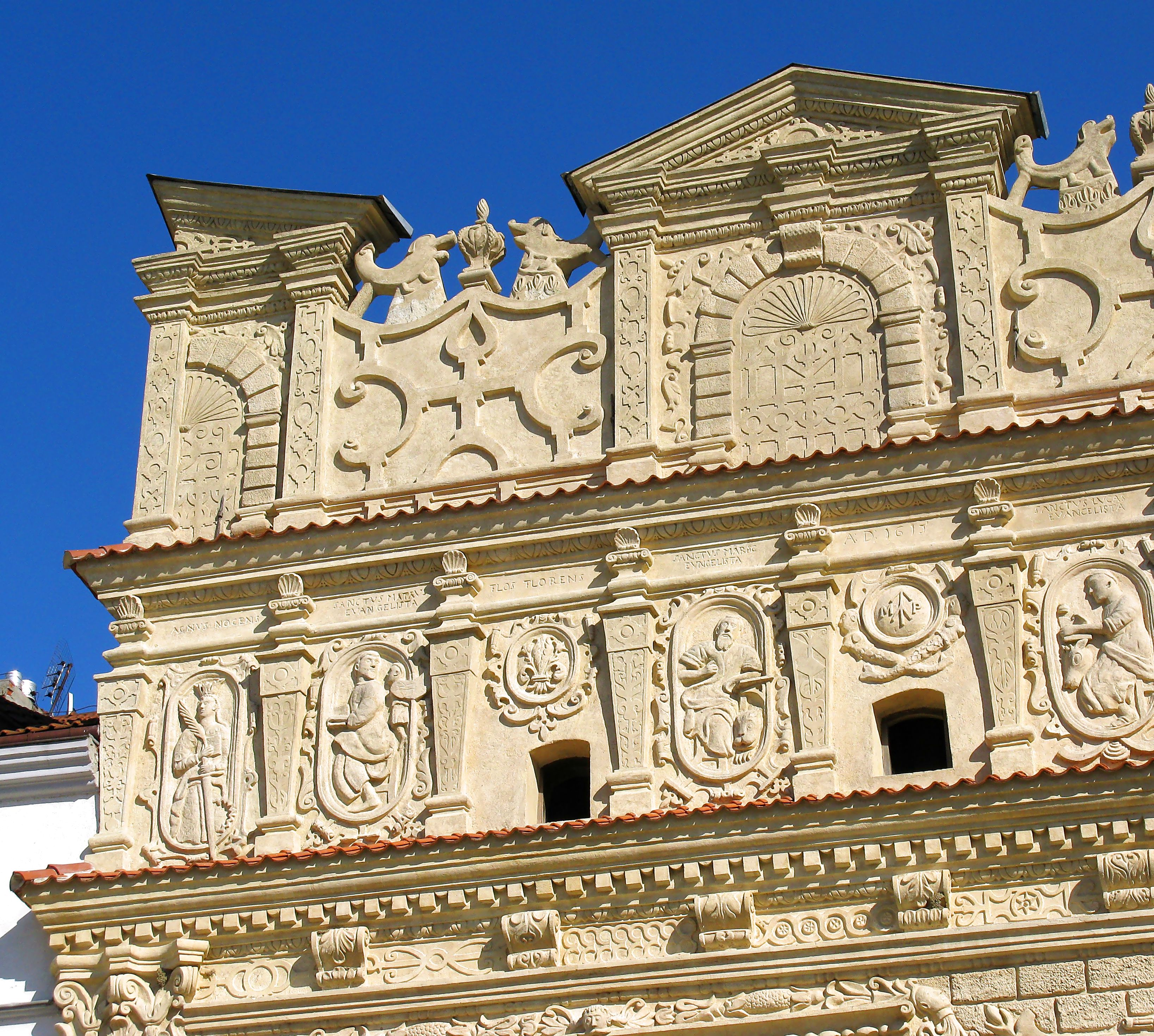
Mikołaj Przybyła's House attic (1615), Polish-style mannerism (Lublin type), Kazimierz Dolny

Mannerist architecture and sculpture in Poland dominated between 1550 and 1650, when it was finally replaced with baroque. The style includes various mannerist traditions, which are closely related with ethnic and religious diversity of the country, as well as with its economic and political situation at that time. The mannerist complex of Kalwaria Zebrzydowska and mannerist City of Zamość are UNESCO World Heritage Sites.

== Conditions of development and features ==
The period between 1550 and 1650 was a Golden Age of the Polish–Lithuanian Commonwealth (created in 1569) and a Golden Age of Poland. It was a time of economic prosperity due to grain trade. Grain was kept in richly embellished granaries (e.g. in Kazimierz Dolny) and transported along the Vistula to the main port of Poland - Gdańsk, where it was sold to the Netherlands, England, France, Italy, and Spain (about 80% of the city's revenues in the beginning of the 17th century came from grain trade). It was also the time of religious tolerance due to the Warsaw Confederation (1573).

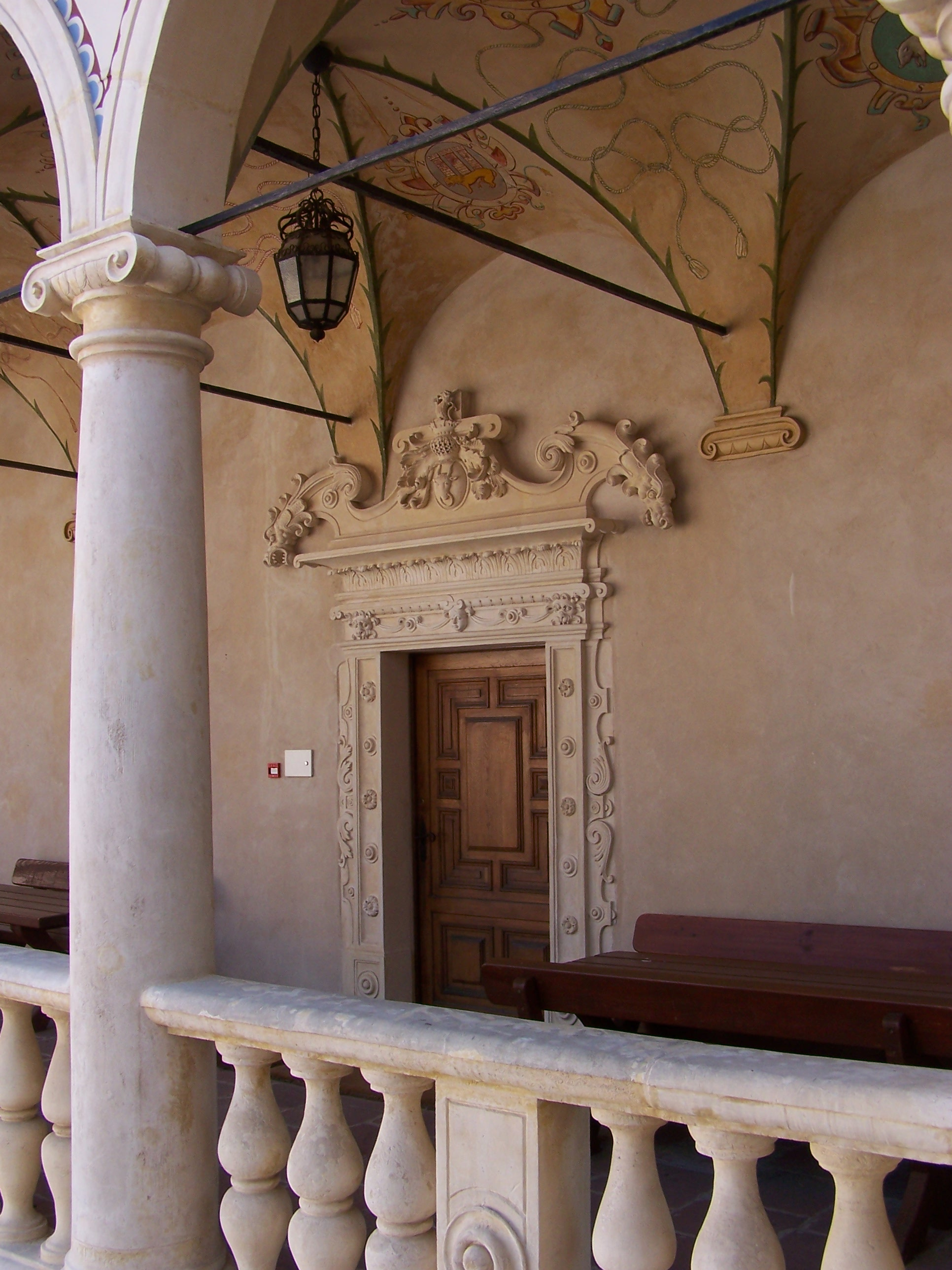
Arcade and portal of Leszczyński Castle, circle of Santi Gucci (1591–1606), Polish-style mannerism, Baranów Sandomierski

Poland was a multinational (Poles, Ruthenians, Jews, Germans, Italians, Dutch, Flemish, Armenians, Scots, Bohemians, and Tatars) and multi-religious country (Roman Catholics, Eastern Orthodox, Greek Catholics, Calvinists, Lutherans, Muslims, Polish Brethren, Hussites and many others). All those nations and worships contributed to creation of the exceptional diversity of mannerist architecture and sculpture in Poland. The first half of the 17th century is marked by strong activity of the Jesuits and Counter-Reformation, which led to banishing of progressive Arians (Polish Brethren) in 1658 and which has its reflection in architecture (spread of baroque). Despite that Poland remain a "country without stakes". All the major wars and military conflicts were conducted far from the territory of today's Poland, so the country could develop equally. Those favorable conditions are the reason why mannerist architecture and sculpture in Poland left so many beautiful examples.

The mannerist architecture and sculpture have two major traditions: Polish-Italian and Netherlandish (Dutch-Flemish), that dominated in northern Poland. The Silesian mannerism of South-Western Poland was largely influenced by Bohemian and German mannerism, while the Pomeranian mannerism of North-Western Poland was influenced by Gothic tradition and Northern German mannerism. The Jews in Poland adapted patterns of Italian and Polish mannerism to their own tradition.

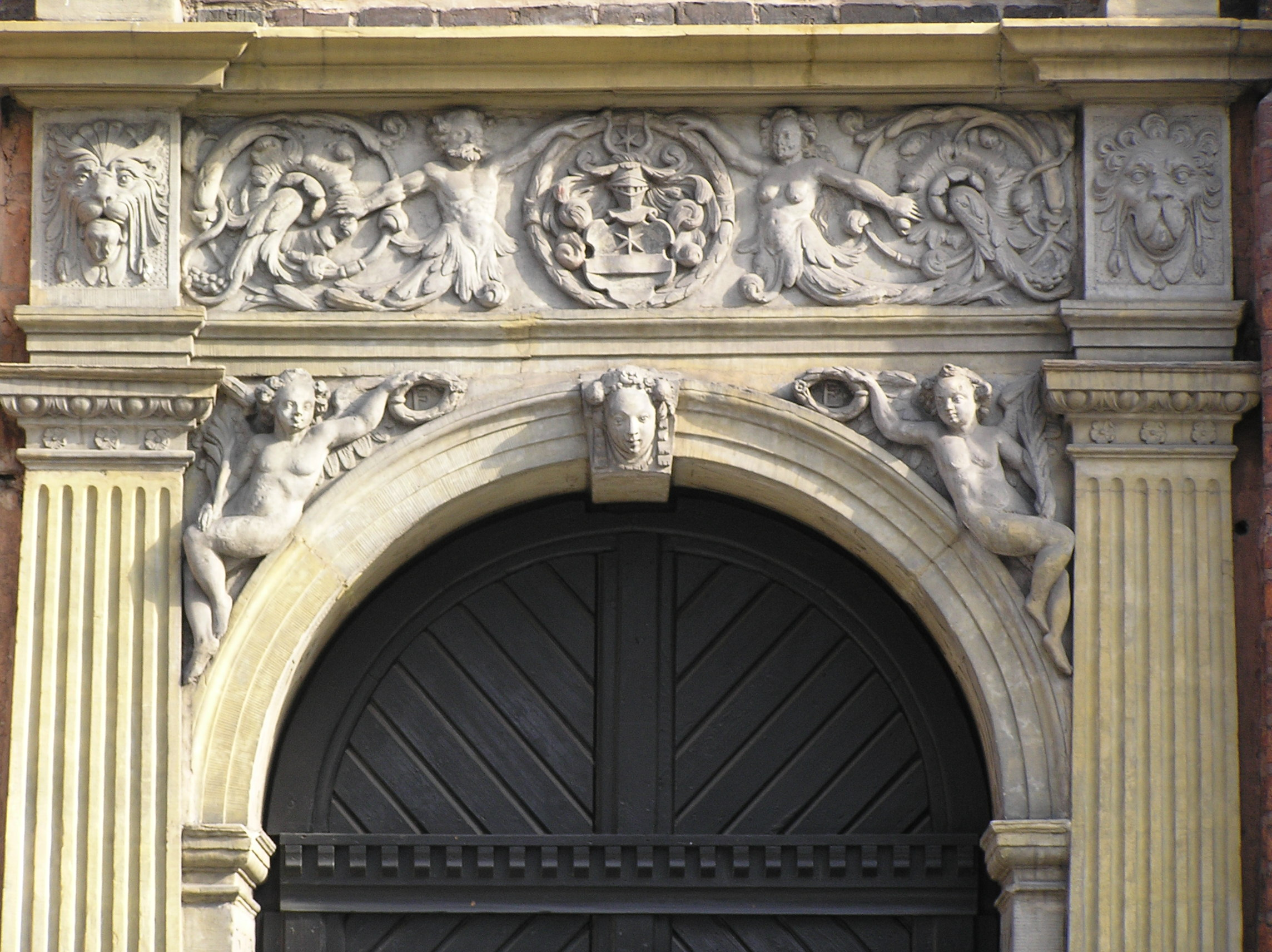
Esken House portal, Willem van den Blocke (c. 1590), Netherlandish-style mannerism, Toru

The major inspiration for many structures in Poland was early renaissance constructions at Wawel Hill – Sigismund's Chapel (1519–1533), tomb of king Sigismund I inside the chapel (1529–1531), and Wawel Castle's arcade courtyard (1506–1534), as well as buildings in Antwerp - City Hall (1561–1565), houses at Grote Markt and funeral sculptures by the Flemish artist Cornelis Floris de Vriendt. In conclusion the main criterion of differentiation between types of mannerism in Poland is the source of inspiration and in many cases the founders conception played an essential role for the final shape of the construction (e.g., Tomb of Jędrzej Noskowski in Maków Mazowiecki by Willem van den Blocke is an example of Polish mannerism inspired by Tomb of Sigismund I with a founder depicted sleeping).

Triangle gables of late Gothic origin and large windows are the features of Dutch urban architecture in Northern Poland. The Polish mannerism, though largely dominated by Italian architects and sculptors, has its unique characteristics that differentiate it from its Italian equivalent (attics, decorational motives, construction and shape of buildings, Dutch, Bohemian and German influences). Among notable architects and sculptors of Netherlandish Mannerism in Poland were Anthonis van Obbergen, Willem van den Blocke, Abraham van den Blocke, Jan Strakowski, Paul Baudarth, Gerhard Hendrik, Hans Kramer and Regnier van Amsterdam and of Polish/Italian mannerism Santi Gucci, Jan Michałowicz of Urzędów, Giovanni Maria Padovano, Giovanni Battista di Quadro, Jan Frankiewicz, Galleazzo Appiani, Jan Jaroszewicz, Bernardo Morando, Kasper Fodyga, Krzysztof Bonadura, Antoneo de Galia and many others.

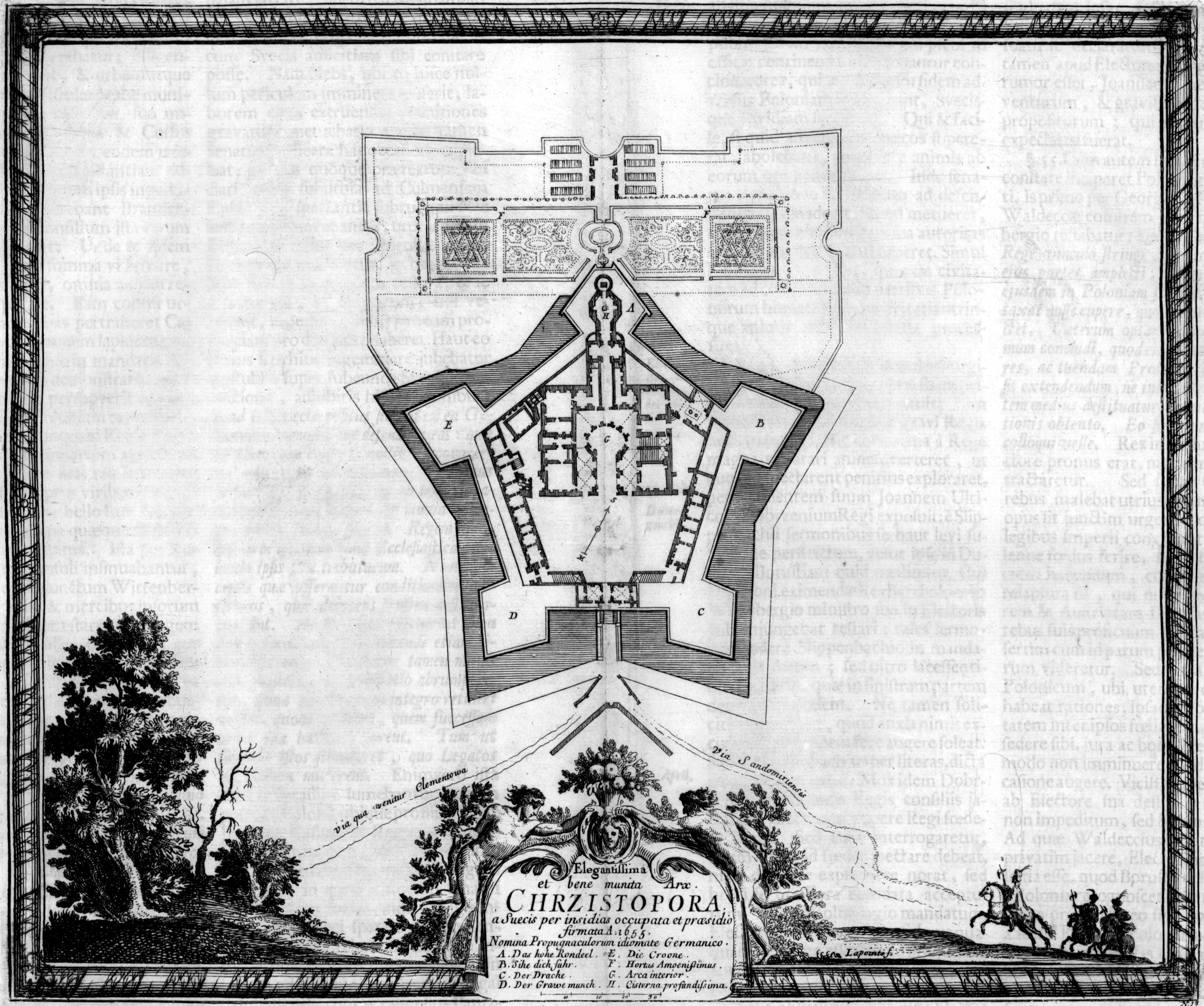
Plan of fortified Krzyżtopór Palace, built by Wawrzyniec Senes (1621–1644), Polish-style mannerism, Ujazd

The architecture of the 16th-century Polish mannerism is marked by common usage of richly embellished attics of palaces and houses, arcade courtyards and side towers. The church architecture combined the late gothic tradition with renaissance symmetry and mannerist decoration. Churches were slender, usually without towers. The 17th-century Polish mannerism characterize with much more simplicity in decoration in benefit to harmony of the construction. The model to the early 17th-century residences were royal palaces. Ujazdów Castle constructed for king Sigismund III Vasa was possible inspiration to the Bishop Palace in Kielce, whereas the Kielce palace was imitated by many magnate families in their residencies (e.g., Tarło Palace in Podzamcze, 1645–1650, and Radziwiłł Palace in Biała Podlaska). This type of the palace is known as Poggio–Reale because it combined a square building with a central loggia with side towers, as in Villa Poggio Reale near Naples (1487–1489) according to conception of Baldassare Peruzzi and Sebastiano Serlio. Side towers become an obligatory element of every palace and funeral church chapels, modelled after mentioned Sigismund's Chapel, flourished all over Poland (Staszów, Włocławek). Another characteristics of the mannerism in Poland are city and palace fortifications built in Dutch style (Zamość, Ujazd) and town halls with high towers (Biecz, Zamość, Poznań). The most popular decoration techniques were relief (Kazimierz Dolny), sgraffito (Krasiczyn), and rustication (Książ Wielki), whereas the material was mainly brick, plastered brick, sandstone, and sometimes limestone. For some time the late renaissance coexisted with early baroque (introduced in Poland in 1597 with Church of SS. Peter and Paul in Kraków).

Netherlandish (Dutch-Flemish) and Polish-Italian architectural traditions were not isolated and penetrate each other to create (among others) a unique composition of Krzyżtopór Palace. This, one of the largest constructions of mannerism and early baroque in Poland, was intended as a fortified palace (type known in Poland under Italian name palazzo in fortezza). The complex combined Dutch style fortifications with a palace built to Italian design (inspirations of Palazzo Farnese in Caprarola are visible in the plan of the complex), mannerist Polish decoration and some other, presumably Dutch elements (octagonal tower resembling Binnenhof's Torentje in The Hague, spires). The palace was destroyed during the Deluge and currently remains in ruins.

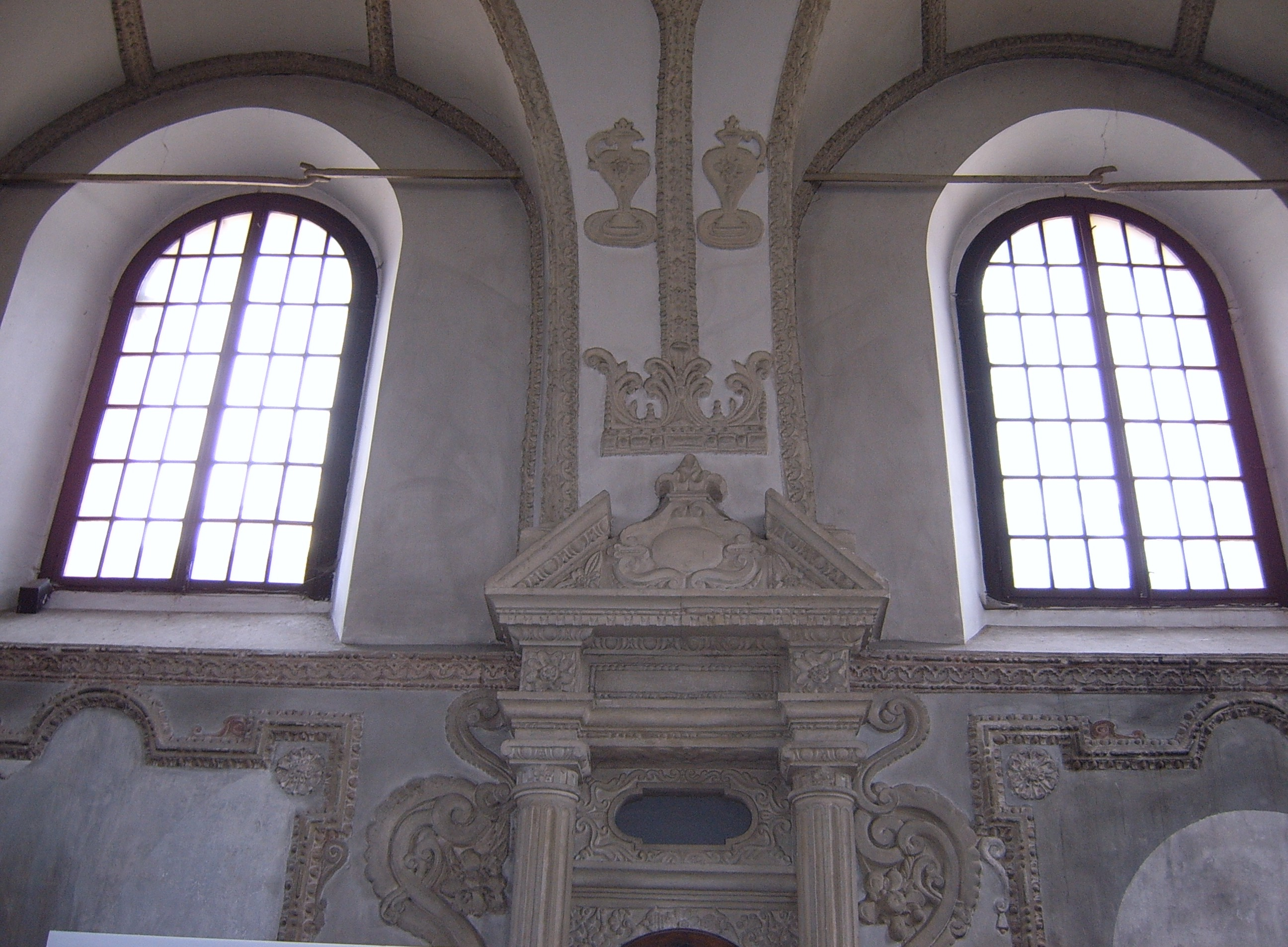
Interior of the Sephardic Synagogue (1610–1620), Jewish-style mannerism (influenced by Lublin renaissance), Zamość

Lublin region created its own style with folk motives (Kazimierz Dolny), while the urban mannerism in Greater Poland replaced the gothic gables with Italian style arcades, tympanums, friezes and pillars in tuscan order (Poznań). Warsaw, as one of the main cities of the Polish-Lithuanian Commonwealth and due to its role as seat of Parliament and King, was a place of meetings of cultures. The mannerist architecture in the city was a combination of many types of mannerist traditions, including Lublin type (Jesuit Church), Greater Poland mannerism (Kanonia), Italian mannerism with elements of early baroque (Royal Castle), Lesser Poland mannerism (Kryski Chapel), Poggio–Reale type (Villa Regia Palace – not existing), Bohemian and Netherlandish Mannerism (Ossoliński Palace – not existing, possible inspiration to palace's upper parts pavilion with characteristic roof was Bonifaz Wohlmut's reconstruction of Belvedere in Prague, 1557–1563).

The Bohemian mannerism had also large influence on the architecture and sculpture in Poland. This concerned not only the lands that were part of the Kingdom of Bohemia, like Silesia. The familiar relations between the Habsburgs and the Polish Vasas enabled to draw form the patterns of Prague mannerism. Both king Sigismund III and his son Władysław IV Vasa as well as magnates purchased many sculptures in Prague, especially those by Adriaen de Vries. Bohemian mannerism in Silesia joined the Prague renaissance with its brunelleschian arcades (inspired by Queen Anna Jagiellon's Belvedere in Prague, 1535–1537) and German influences originating from the late gothic (steep gable with renaissance decoration). Also Silesian mannerism had its impact on neighbouring regions – the arcade courtyard of the Piast Castle in Brzeg, with arcades replaced in upper parts with columns (constructed by Francesco de Pario, 1556–1558), was possible inspiration for similar constructions in Bohemia – Opočno Castle (1560–1567), Jindřichův Hradec Castle (loggia, before 1597), and Schloss Güstrow in Germany (built by Pario after 1558).

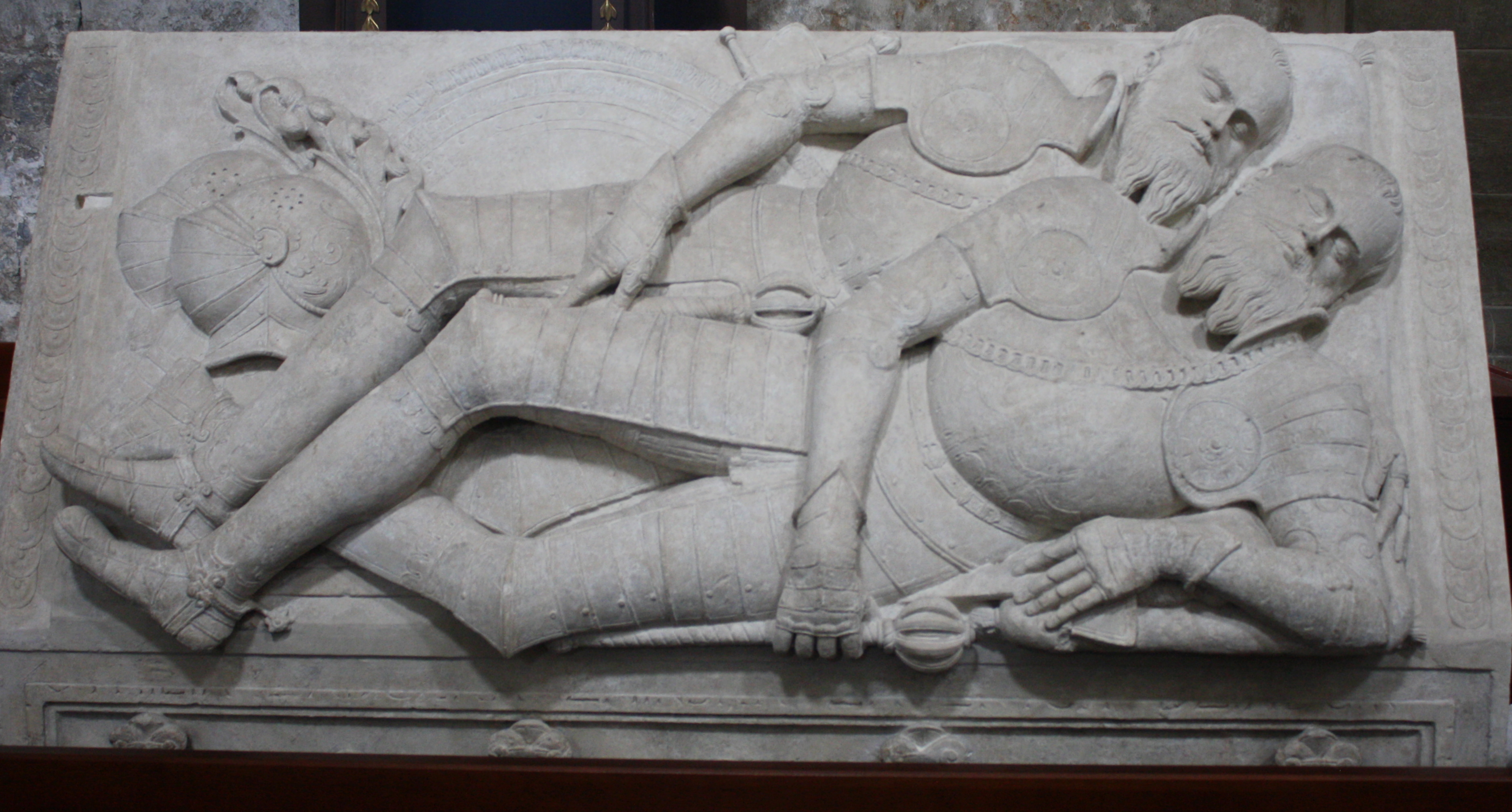
Tomb of Niedrzwicki Brothers, Santi Gucci (1581), Polish-style mannerism, St. Mary's Church in Koprzywnica

Characteristic for Jewish mannerism in Poland is adjustment of the Polish/Italian patterns to the Jewish tradition, rejection of human images in benefit to the sophisticated floral-animal decorations (tendrils, lions), mythological creatures (unicorns, griffins) and Hebrew inscriptions. The synagogues were adorned with horizontal attics (Zamość) or had a richly decorated interior (Pińczów). The main decorating techniques were fresco (Tykocin, Pińczów), relief, and stucco (Zamość).

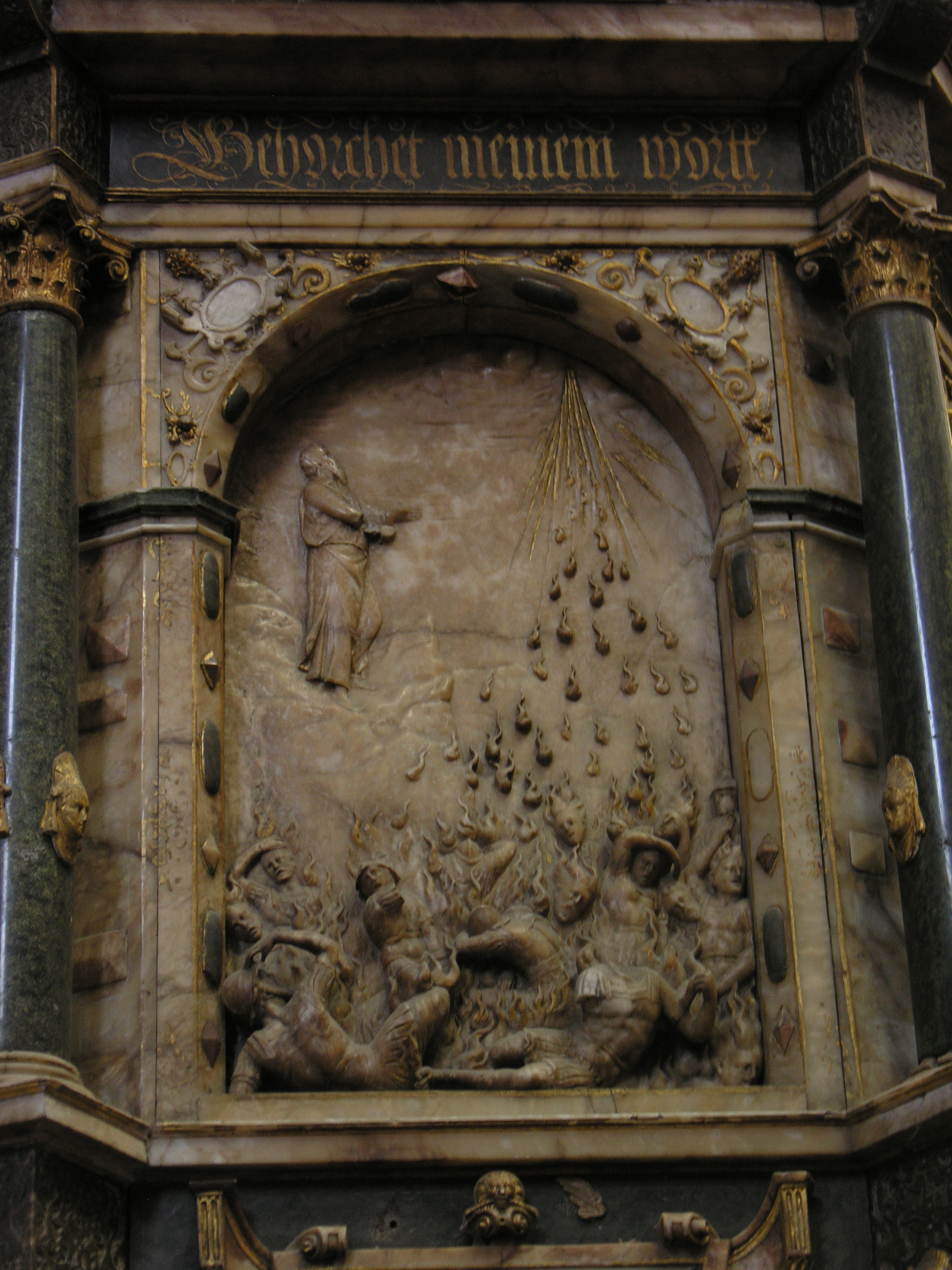
Prophet Elijah, Friedrich Gross (1579–1580), German-style mannerism, relief from the pulpit in St. Mary Magdalene's Church in Wrocław

The sculpture is mainly represented in sepulchral art and decorations of facades. Free standing sculptures are rare, though before the Deluge gardens of many residencies were adorned with sculptures (e.g., Villa Regia Palace's garden in Warsaw was embellished with sculptures by Adriaen de Vries). Also the free standing tomb monuments were uncommon. The tombs were generally constructed to be attached to the wall, exception is the Niedrzwicki Brothers Tomb in Koprzywnica. During the first stage of mannerism in Poland, the tomb monuments were constructed according to the early renaissance tradition, where the deceased was depicted sleeping. They were generally made of sandstone, while the founder's figure was carved in red marble (e.g. Tarnowski Tomb in Tarnów Cathedral). In the beginning of the 17th century, Dutch and Flemish architects and sculptors (especially Willem van den Blocke and his son Abraham) popularised in Poland new type of tomb monument originating from the Cornelis Floris workshop (e.g. not existing Tomb of duke Albert of Prussia in the Königsberg Cathedral). The founders were depicted kneeling, the construction was more spacious and it employ darker materials – brown marbles from Chęciny, black marbles from Dębnik or imported from the Spanish Netherlands (e.g. Tomb of Báthory brothers in Barczewo). Some of the most impressive Dutch style tombs in Poland were constructed far from the center of Netherlandish Mannerism in Poland - Gdańsk. These were tombs of Jan Tarnowski in Łowicz (1603–1604) and of Ostrogski family in Tarnów (1612–1620).

Many of the mannerist structures in Poland are postwar reconstructions. They were destroyed by the Germans during the World War II (e.g., all mannerist constructions in Warsaw and many Jewish pray houses) or damaged in Allied aerial bombings (Gdańsk, Wrocław). Also, many were not restored after the war (e.g., tomb monument of Wolski Brothers in Warsaw, by Jan Michałowicz, destroyed in 1944; or Tarnów Synagogue, destroyed in 1939).

== List of notable mannerist structures in Poland ==
=== Northern Poland ===
Place	Building	Date of construction	Style and history	Image
Chełmno	Town Hall	1567–1572	Netherlandish/Polish mannerism. The original building was built in 1298. The tower was added between 1584 and 1596. Architecture of the building had many influences - horizontal attic embellished with volutes is characteristic for Polish mannerism, the elevated gables and soaring windows are in Netherlandish/Flemish style and tower decorated with corner rustication is typical for similar structures in Germany.	
Gdańsk	Golden House	1609–1618	Netherlandish Mannerism (architect Abraham van den Blocke). Built for Johann Speymann, a wealthy grain trader and mayor of the city, and his wife Judith Bahr. The attic is decorated with sculptures depicting Cleopatra, Oedipus, Achilles and Antigone by Johann Vogt of Rostock.	
Gdańsk	Golden Gate	1612–1614	Netherlandish Mannerism (constructed by Jan Strakowski to design by Abraham van den Blocke). The attic was adorned with allegorical sculptures of citizen's virtues: Peace, Liberty, Fortune and Fame (west side), Harmony, Justice, Piety and Prudence (east side). They were carved in 1648 by Peter Ringering to Jeremias Falck's design.	
Gdańsk	Green Gate	1564–1568	Netherlandish Mannerism, inspired by the Antwerp City Hall (architect Regnier van Amsterdam). It was built to serve as the formal residence of the Polish monarchs.	
Gdańsk	Neptune's Fountain	1617	Netherlandish Mannerism (design by Abraham van den Blocke). The fountain was founded by the city councillors at Barthell Schachtmann's initiative. The Neptune's statue was cast in Augsburg by Peter Husen and Johann Rogge. In 1634 the fountain was encompassed by a fence decorated with gilded Polish Eagles, also designed by Abraham van den Blocke.	
Gdańsk	Old Arsenal	1602–1605	Netherlandish Mannerism (architects Anthonis van Obbergen, Jan Strakowski and Abraham van den Blocke).	
Gdańsk	Schumann House	1560	Netherlandish Mannerism. Built for Hans Conert the Younger by unknown architect. The building was known at that time as the King's House. The top of the house is decorated with the sculpture of Zeus. Schumann House's architecture bears strong resemblance to Gildehuis der Kuipers (Coopers' House) and to Huis van de Schutters (Archer's House) in Antwerp.	
Gdańsk	St. Mary's Church – Epitaph of Edward Blemke	1591	Netherlandish Mannerism (sculptor Willem van den Blocke). The central relief depicts the resurrection in the Valley of Josaphat according to prophet Ezekiel's vision (the dynamic of skeletons' transformation from bones to corpse is exceptional). The epitaph was crowned with a sculpture of death. Inspiration were epitaphs by Cornelis Floris - the construction bears resemblance to Epitaph of Dirk van Assendelft and his wife Adriana van Nassau in Grote Kerk in Breda (1555).	
Oliwa	Oliwa Cathedral – Kos Tomb	1599–1620	Netherlandish Mannerism (sculptor Willem van den Blocke). Established by Mikołaj Kos, landlord in Żukczyn. Mikołaj and his son Andrzej were depicted wearing armours of Polish hussars.	
Szczecin	Pomeranian Dukes Castle	1573−1582	Pomeranian mannerism (architect Wilhelm Zachariasz Italus). The original castle (built in 1346 by duke Barnim the Great) was rebuilt in the late renaissance style for duke John Frederick.	
Włocławek	Włocławek Cathedral – Chapel of the Blessed Virgin Mary	1604–1611	Polish mannerism. Originally built in 1503, it was reconstructed in the mannerist style by bishop Jan Tarnowski. The architecture of the chapel, though inspired by Sigismund's Chapel was adapted and transformed according to Dutch patterns. The dome was hidden behind the balustrade and the walls were covered with a subtle corner rustication.	

=== Central Poland ===
Place	Building	Date of construction	Style and history	Image
Drobin	Church of Our Lady of the Rosary and St. Stanisław – Kryski Tomb	1572–1576	Italian/Polish mannerism (circle of Santi Gucci). Established by Stanisław Kryski, voivode of Masovia. It depicts Stanisław's parents Paweł Kryski, his wife Anna Szreńska and their son Wojciech Kryski, chamberlain of Płock. The structure was by most account inspired by the tombs in the Medici Chapel in the Basilica of San Lorenzo in Florence and the tomb of Pope Julius II in San Pietro in Vincoli in Rome, designed by Michelangelo.	
Gołąb	Church of St. Catherine and St. Florian	1628–1638	Polish mannerism (circle of Santi Gucci) with elements of Dutch mannierism (ferrule ornament). The church was established by priest Szymon Grzybowski.	
Gołąb	Loreto House	1634–1642	Italian mannerism, an exact replica of the Loreto House in Italy. Founded by Chancellor Jerzy Ossoliński. The main decorating features are ceramic statues of prophets, created under strong influence of Michelangelo's works.	
Kazimierz Dolny	Celej House	before 1635	Polish mannerism (Lublin type, circle of Santi Gucci), the attic is decorated with folk motives (basilisks, dragons and birds among others) Built for a wealthy merchant Bartłomiej Celej.	
Kazimierz Dolny	Church of St. John the Baptist and St. Bartholomew	1586–1613	Polish mannerism (architect Jakub Balin). The original 14th-century building burned in 1561. The initiators of the reconstruction and the founders were the Firlejs. The church was enhanced and covered with a cradle vault with lanterns. The gothic gables were rebuilt in the late renaissance style.	
Kazimierz Dolny	Mikołaj Przybyła Granary	1591	Polish mannerism. In the beginning of the 17th century there were about 60 granaries in the town.	
Kazimierz Dolny	Przybyła Houses	1615	Polish mannerism (Lublin type with folk motives). Built for two brothers Mikołaj and Krzysztof Przybyła.	
Lublin	Carmelite Church	1635–1644	Polish mannerism (Lublin type). The church was founded by Katarzyna z Kretków Sanguszkowa for Discalced Carmelite Sisters. The main gabled facade was decorated with arcade-pilaster divisions and frescoes. Nave elevations were divided with pilasters supporting the console cornice.	
Lublin	Konopnica House	1575	Polish mannerism. The original late gothic house (built before 1512) was obtained by Sebastian Konopnica as a dowry of his wife Katarzyna z Kretków. Konopnica, city mayor of Lublin, rebuilt the house in mannerist style. Rich decorations of windows with medallions bearing effigies of Sebastian Konopnica and his wife Katarzyna are attributed to Pińczów workshop.	
Pabianice	Manor house	1565–1571	Polish mannerism (architect Wawrzyniec Lorek). Built for canon Stanisław Dąbrowski.	
Poznań	City Hall	1550–1567	Italian/Polish mannerism (architect Giovanni Battista di Quadro). The town hall was built during the turn of the 13th and 14th centuries. In the 16th century the building was enhanced, roofs were covered with attics and facade was embellished with a three-story loggia.	
Poznań	Poznań Cathedral – Tomb of bishop Izdbieński	1557–1560	Polish mannerism (sculptor Jan Michałowicz of Urzędów). It was established for Benedykt Izdbieński, bishop of Poznań by his heirs. The tomb was carved in sandstone and red marble and adorned with profuse floral decorations. Characteristic for Michałowicz blend of Netherlandish and Italian influences is visible in the tomb.	
Poznań	Ridt House	1576	Polish mannerism (Greater Poland type, architect Giovanni Battista di Quadro). The gothic building was purchased in 1566 by Zachariasz Ridt, a rich cloth and leather merchant. Zachariasz, who was also a senior pastor of the Lutheran community in Poznań, rebuilt the house in mannerist style. The tuscan order, decorational features of the gable (volutes and pillars) as well as division of facade surfaces with simple details are typical for Greater Poland mannerism.	
Siedlisko	Schönaich Castle	1597–1618	German mannerism (architect Melchior Duckhardt). The original wooden castrum in Sedlscho was replaced between 1550 and 1560 by a brick building. It was later enlarged and reconstructed for Georg Schönaich, who also built a chapel (Protestant rood screen) with mannerist decorations.	
Uchanie	Church of the Assumption of Mary – Uchański Tomb	c. 1607	Polish mannerism (sculptor Santi Gucci). Established by Anny Herburtówna to commemorate herself and her husband Paweł Uchański, voivode of Bełz. Made of sandstone with marble incrustatins, adorned with profuse floral and animal decorations. The effigies of the deceased were carved in alabaster.	
Warsaw	Jesuit Church	1609–1626	Polish mannerism (Lublin type, architect Jan Frankiewicz). The church was founded by King Sigismund III Vasa and a chamberlain Andrzej Bobola (the Old) at Piotr Skarga's initiative, in 1609.	
Warsaw	Negro House	1622–1628	Polish mannerism. The reconstruction of the gothic house (built before 1449) in the mannierist style was started by Jana Kluga and accomplished by Jakub Gianotti, who get a special tax exemption for this undertaking from the city municipalities. The facade was adorned with two richly decorated portals and a medallion with effigy of Negro, attributed to Gucci's workshop. This sculpture gave its name to the house. One of the portals bears a mark of ownership (gmerk) with initials 'IG' of Jakub Gianotti.	
Warsaw	Royal Castle	1598–1619	Polish mannerism/early baroque (architect Giovanni Battista Trevano - his plans were probably amended by Vincenzo Scamozzi). The original castle, built between 1407 and 1410, was expanded for king Sigismund III Vasa by a group of Italian architects and sculptors, including Giacomo Rodondo, Paolo del Corte and Matteo Castelli.	
Zamość	Armenian Houses No. 30-26	first half of the 17th century	Polish mannerism. No. 30 (green) - rebuilt in 1665–74 for Jan Wilczek and adorned with profuse floral-animal motives, No. 28 (dark yellow) - built in 1645–47 for Bazyli Rudomicz professor of the Zamojski Academy, No. 26 (red) - built in 1632–34 for Armenian merchant Gabriel Bartoszewicz.	
Zamość	Cathedral	1587–1637	Polish mannerism (Lublin type, architect Bernardo Morando). It was constructed as a three-nave basilica with side chapels. The main 20m high nave was covered with a cradle vault with lanterns. The naves are divided by thick corinthian pillars crowned with richly decorated entablature. Vaults were embellished with moldings (geometric, floral and figural motives).	
Zamość	Synagogue	1610–1620	Jewish mannerism. Built for the Sephardi Jews. The interior was richly decorated with stucco in Kalisian-Lublin style. The main part was a great pray hall (11.5 x 12.2 m).	
Zamość	Town Hall	1591–1622	Polish mannerism (architect Bernardo Morando). Between 1639 and 1651 it was rebuilt by Jan Jaroszewicz and Jan Wolff. The building was enlarged and enhanced by adding another storey with high mannerist attic, while the horseshoe shaped staircase is an 18th-century addition. The clock tower is 52 meters tall and consist of five levels on square and octagonal plan.	

=== Southern Poland ===
Place	Building	Date of construction	Style and history	Image
Baranów Sandomierski	Leszczyński Castle	1591–1606	Polish mannerism (circle of Santi Gucci). The castle was built for Rafał Leszczyński and his son Andrzej as a fortified palace (palazzo in fortezza). The architecture of the castle merge all the characteristics of Polish mannerism - side towers, arcade courtyard and richly decorated attic.	
Brzeg	Piast Castle Courtyard	1556–1558	Silesian mannerism (architect Francesco de Pario of Bissone). The original gothic castle was rebuilt for Jerzy II the Magnificent, duke of Brzeg and Legnica. It was probably inspired by Wawel Castle courtyard. The architecture of the castle's arcades bears strong resemblance to Opočno Castle in the Czech Republic and Schloss Güstrow in Germany.	
Brzeg	Piast Castle Gate	1554–1560	Silesian mannerism. The gate was adorned with profuse mannerist reliefs and sculptures of Jerzy II and his wife Barbara of Brandenburg. The busts depicts 24 Piasts, ancestors of Jerzy II - 12 rulers of Poland from the legendary Piast the Wheelwright to Władysław II the Exile and 12 dukes of Silesia from Henry I the Bearded to Frederick II of Legnica. The inspiration for this decoration were woodcuts from the 1521 Chronica Polonorum by Maciej Miechowita.	
Jarosław	Orsetti House	1570–1593, 1646	Polish mannerism. Built for Stanisław Smiszowic, Jarosław's apothecary. In 1633 the building was purchased by Wilhelm Orsetti and rebuilt in 1646.	
Kalwaria Zebrzydowska	Ecce Homo Chapel	1605–1609	Netherlandish Mannerism (architect Paul Baudarth). It was built on the plan of the Greek cross. The vault adorned with profuse stucco decorations in the style of Dutch mannerism.	
Kielce	Bishops' Palace	1637–1644	Italian/Netherlandish Mannerism (architect Tommaso Poncino). The palace was established by Jakub Zadzik, bishop of Kraków. The building was inspired by the royal residences in Warsaw and modelled in the so-called Poggio–Reale style. Steep roofs, towers and decorations are Netherlandish/Flemish style features.	
Kraków	Ciborium in St. Mary's Basilica	1552	Polish mannerism (sculptor Giovanni Maria Padovano). The St. Mary's Basilica's Ciborium was established by Kraków's goldsmiths Andrzej Mastelli and Jerzy Pipan. It was made of sandstone and adorned with red Salzburg marble, alabaster and stucco. A cast bronze balustrade was created in 1595 by Michał Otto and decorated with Polish and Lithuanian coat of arms.	
Kraków	Decjusz Villa	1630	Italian mannerism (architect Maciej Trapola). The original villa, built between 1528 and 1535 for Justus Decjusz, was rebuilt for Sebastian Lubomirski. Inspiration for this reconstruction was a renaissance treaty by Sebastiano Serlio.	
Kraków	Holy Trinity Church – Gonzaga-Myszkowski Chapel	1603–1614	Polish mannerism/early baroque (architect Santi Gucci), decorated with rustication. The chapel was modelled after the Sigismund's Chapel (1519–1533). It was founded by Zygmunt Gonzaga-Myszkowski (together with his brother Piotr, he was adopted in 1597 by Vincenzo Gonzaga, Duke of Mantua).	
Kraków	Prelate House	1618–1619	Polish mannerism (architects Maciej Litwinkowicz and Jan Zatorczyk). The characteristics are late renaissance attic by Zatorczyk (1625) and sgraffito decoration imitating diamond-pointed rustication.	
Kraków	Wawel Cathedral – Stephen Báthory Tomb	1594–1595	Polish mannerism (sculptor Santi Gucci). Established by Queen Anna Jagiellon to commemorate her husband Stephen Báthory. Made of sandstone, red marble and alabaster.	
Krasiczyn	Krasicki Palace	1580–1631	Polish mannerism (architect Galleazzo Appiani). The construction was started by Stanisław Krasicki and accomplished by his son Marcin Krasicki, voivode of Podolia. It was built as a fortified palace. Each tower of the Krasicki Palace is different and both inner and the outer facades were decorated with profuse sgraffitos (they cover more than 7000 square meters in total).	
Książ Wielki	Mirów Palace	1585–1595	Polish mannerism (architect Santi Gucci). Founded by Piotr Myszkowski, bishop of Cracow as a fortified palace (palazzo in fortezza). The palace is decorated with rusticated stonework.	
Lesko	Fortified Synagogue	1626–1654	Jewish mannerism. The facade bears a Hebrew inscription that reads: He was afraid and said, "How awesome is this place! This is none other than the house of God; this is the gate of heaven." (Genesis 28:17)	
Oleśnica	Ducal Castle	1585–1608	German mannerism (architect Bernard Niuron). The original gothic castle (built by duke Konrad I of Oleśnica) was successively enlarged and rebuilt by the powerful bohemian magnats the Poděbrads. The reconstruction in mannerist style began in 1585. Duke Charles II built a new eastern and southern wings. He also rebuilt the so-called Widow Palace. The courtyard was emebllished with characteristic balconies and the main gate portal was adorned with Silesian and Poděbrad family crests.	
Pińczów	St. Anne's Chapel	1600	Polish mannerism (architect Santi Gucci). The building was established by Zygmunt Gonzaga-Myszkowski, marquess in Mirów to commemorate a Jubilee of 1600.	
Przemyśl	Carmelite Church	1624–1630	Polish mannerism (architect - probably Galleazzo Appiani). The church was founded in 1620 by Marcin Krasicki, starost of Przemyśl and owner of Krasiczyn. The construction started in 1630 and was conducted by master craftsman Ligęski of Przemyśl.	
Przemyśl	Przemyśl Cathedral – Fredro Tomb	after 1622	Polish mannerism. The tomb monument was constructed for Jan Fredro, castellan of Przemyśl and his wife Anna ze Stadnickich. It was carved in limestone and alabaster in tuscan order. The top of the tomb is decorated with a sculpture of archangel Michael.	
Rzeszów	Alabaster Altar in Bernardine Church	before 1637	German mannerism. Commissioned by Mikołaj Spytek Ligęza and executed by Johann Pfister or Johann Behem. The central bas-relief in alabaster depicts the Lamentation of Christ and is supplemented with seven wooden, waxed and gilded reliefs with scenes from the Passion (from bottom right): Christ in the Garden of Olives, Flagellation, Crowning with thorns, Fall under the cross, Christ being nailed to the Cross, Elevation of the Cross and Descent from the Cross and three alabaster reliefs in predella: the Archangel Gabriel, Saint Anne and the Annunciation.	
Staszów	Church of St. Bartholomew – Tęczyński Chapel	1618–1625	Polish mannerism (Pińczów workshop, circle of Santi Gucci). Tęczyński Chapel was founded by Katarzyna Leszczyńska to commemorate her husband Andrzej Tęczyński, castellan of Bełz and son Jacek. The chapel was modelled after the Sigismund's Chapel and decorated with rustication.	
Sucha Beskidzka	Komorowski Castle	1608–1614	Polish mannerism (architect - probably Paul Baudarth). The original defensive mansion built between 1554 and 1580 was enlarged and rebuilt for Piotr Komorowski.	
Tarnów	Tarnów Cathedral – Ostrogski Tomb	1612–1620	Netherlandish Mannerism (design by Willem van den Blocke). Established by Janusz Ostrogski, voivode of Volhyn. Made of black and red marble and yellow alabaster. It depicts the kneeling figures of the founder and his first wife Zsuzsanna Serédi of Felsőnovaj. The monument was enlarged using the trompe-l'œil technique.	
Ujazd	Krzyżtopór	1621–1644	Polish mannerism/early baroque (architect Wawrzyniec Senes of Sent). The palace was built for Krzysztof Ossoliński as a fortified palace with bastions on plan of a regular pentagon. Krzyżtopór has 4 towers (seasons of the year), 12 halls (months), 52 chambers (weeks of the year) and 365 windows (days of the year).	
Wrocław	House of the Griffins	1587–1589	German/Dutch mannerism (architect Friedrich Gross). It is the largest merchant house in Wrocław (16.25m wide), originally built in about 1300. The house was rebuilt for Daniel von Turnau und Kueschmalz and his wife Dorothea von Matte. The mannerist portal with founders' crests was carved by Gerhard Hendrik of Amsterdam. The house was named after griffins decorating the attic.	
Żórawina	Holy Trinity Church	1600–1608	German/Dutch mannerism. The 14th-century church was reconstructed in mannerist style at Adam von Hanniwaldt's initiative. The undertaking was financially supported by Adam's brother Andreas, councillor at the court of Emperor Rudolph II. Among the artists employed in decoration of the church were eminent Netherlandish Mannerist sculptors.	

=== Not existing structures ===
Place	Building	Date of construction	Style and history	Image
Elbląg	Artus Court	1578–1581	Dutch mannerism (architect Hans Schneker of Lindau). The building of the St. George Guild was established and financed by the members of the guild. The official inauguration of the new abode occurred in 1583. It served as a place of meetings of merchants, receptions and performances. The facade of the house represented typical for Dutch mannerism merge of stone and brick elements.	
Warsaw	Town Hall	1580	Polish mannerism (architect Antoneo de Ralia). It was rebuilt between 1620 and 1621. The architecture of the building was similar to many other structures of that type in Poland. It was adorned with attic and four side towers. Clock tower, embellished with an arcade loggia, was covered with a bulbous spire typical for Warsaw mannerist architecture (e.g. Royal Castle, not existing timber manor house of Opaliński family in Warsaw New Town).	
Warsaw	Villa Regia	1626–1639 or 1637–1641	Polish mannerism (architect Giovanni Trevano and Matteo Castelli). The Villa Regia was erected in 1637-41 for King Władysław IV in the mannerist-early Baroque style as a villa suburbana (suburban villa) christened the Villa Regia (Latin: "Royal Villa"). It was constructed as a rectangular building with corner towers, a type of residence known as Poggio–Reale - Serlio.	
Łowicz	Houses	?	Polish mannerism. The facade of the houses represented typical for Polish mannerism elements.	

== See also ==
- Renaissance in Poland
- Bartholomeus Strobel, the leading Mannerist painter in Poland
- Northern Mannerism
