= Zamość Synagogue =

Former Orthodox synagogue in Zamość, Poland

- Polish: Synagoga Dawna w Zamościu
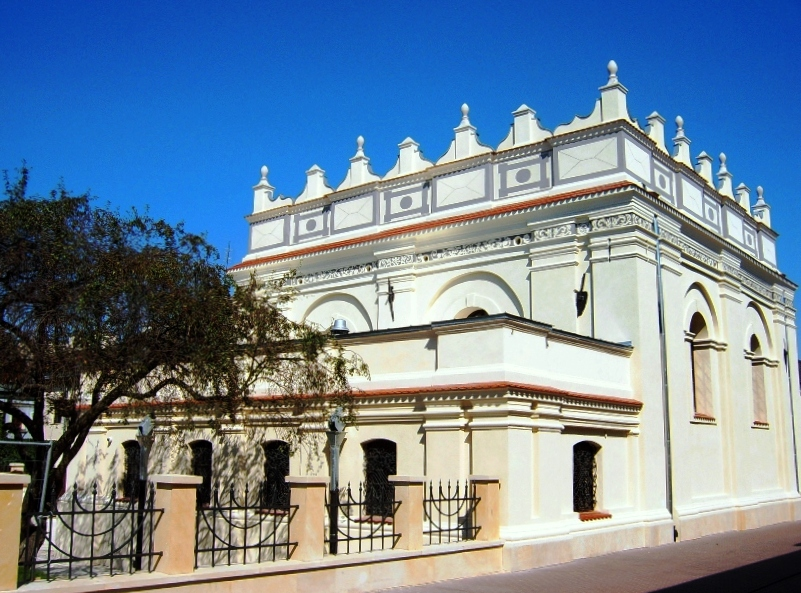
- The former synagogue in 2010

- Location of the former synagogue in Lublin Voivodeship

Religion
- Affiliation: Orthodox Judaism (former)
- Rite: Nusach Sefard (at founding); Nusach Ashkenaz (1620–1939)
- Ecclesiastical or organizational status: Synagogue (1618–1939); Profane use (1929–1960s); Jewish museum (since 2005)
- Status: Inactive (as a synagogue); Repurposed

Location
- Location: 9-11 Zamenhofa Street, Zamość, Lublin Voivodeship
- Country: Poland
- Interactive map of Zamość Synagogue
- Coordinates: 50°43′05″N 23°15′14″E

Architecture
- Type: Synagogue architecture
- Style: Renaissance; Mannerist
- Groundbreaking: 1610
- Completed: 1618

Specifications
- Interior area: 11.6 by 12.2 metres (38 ft × 40 ft)
- Materials: Stone and brick

UNESCO World Heritage Site
- Official name: Old City of Zamość
- Type: Cultural
- Criteria: iv
- Designated: 1992
- Reference no.
- UNESCO region: Europe

The Zamość Synagogue (Polish: Synagoga Dawna w Zamościu), also the Zamość Old Synagogue or the Great Synagogue of Zamość, is a former Jewish congregation and synagogue, located in Zamość, in Lublin Voivodeship, Poland. Completed in 1618 in the Renaissance style, the synagogue is a UNESCO-protected World Heritage Site of Poland. Erected during the times of the Polish–Lithuanian Commonwealth, it functioned as a place of worship for Polish Jews until World War II, when the Nazis turned the interior into a carpenters' workshop. The structure was spared from destruction and in 1992 was listed as a World Heritage Site as part of the Old City of Zamość.

Following WWII, the building fell into disrepair and was used for profane purposes. Restored from 2005, the building was repurposed as a Jewish museum.

== History ==
The first Jews settled in Zamość in 1588, eight years after the founding of the town by Chancellor Jan Zamoyski. They were Sephardim coming from the Ottoman Empire and Venice and consequently established the northernmost Sephardi community in Central and Eastern Europe. It was the Sephardim that built the first synagogue in Zamość in the 1590s as a wooden structure. In 1610, after restrictions prohibiting Jews from building synagogues from stone were rescinded, the current brick building was erected, taking eight years to complete. The original Sephardi community ceased to exist in the 1620s when it assimilated into the fledgling Ashkenazi community, following an economic crisis caused by the accumulation of bad debts by Polish debtors. Ashkenazi Jews had begun settling in Zamość at the beginning of the 17th century having been attracted by the commercial significance of the town. The influx of Ashkenazi Jews increased in the 1640s, especially by refugees fleeing the anti-Jewish massacres perpetrated by the troops of Bohdan Khmelnytsky during the Ukrainian revolt against Polish rule.

The interior, c. 1930.

Today only 3 Jews live in Zamość. In 1939 there were over 12,000 who made up 45% of the city's population. Of these 4,000 initially managed to escape the Holocaust by crossing the Bug River, which in 1939 became the border with the Soviet Union. However, most of these escapees were murdered when Germany invaded the Soviet Union in 1941. The Nazis imprisoned those remaining in a ghetto (the Zamość Ghetto), from which they were transported to the Bełżec death camp. During the Holocaust the synagogue suffered major damage, especially to the northern parts that were destroyed by the Germans. The synagogue was vandalized and looted and then used as a carpenters' workshop. During 1948–1950 it was rebuilt in the communist period and from 1958 until early in the 21st century the building served as a public library. A second restoration of the building was conducted during 1967-1972.

Currently next to the building of the synagogue is the former office of the community, dating from the 18th century with additions from the 19th century, and the cheder. After the Second World War it was transformed into a hotel. The 18th-century building of the former Mikveh, renovated in the 19th century, is located in the cellars at 3 Zamenhofa Street (previously ul. Żydowska - "Jewish Street").

The synagogue was one of the first properties to be officially returned to the Jewish community by the Polish government in 2000 and in 2004 the public library which used the building moved to another location. In 2009 a major reconstruction of the synagogue was underway under the auspices of the Warsaw-based Foundation for the Preservation of Jewish Heritage in Poland. A permanent exhibit will feature a "virtual tour" of the many Jewish shtetls that existed in this region before the Holocaust. In addition to being available for prayer services, the restored main prayer hall of the synagogue will be used for lectures and concerts.

The other synagogue in Zamość is at 32 Gminna Street in the Nowa Osada district. It was erected in 1872 and extended during 1909–1913. In 1948 it was turned into a kindergarten.

== Structure ==
The exterior before the fortress style parapet was added.

The town of Zamość was built and designed as a renaissance "citta ideale" or "ideal city" by the Italian architect Bernardo Morando for chancellor Zamoyski (the Old City quarter of Zamość has been placed on the UNESCO list of World Heritage Sites). The Old Synagogue is a prominent example of late Polish Renaissance or Mannerist style in harmony with the general urban design. The prayer hall represents the core of the building and during the middle of the 17th century two low porches for women were added to the north and south elevations. Similar to that found in other Polish synagogues, the floor was lowered in order to increase the height of the interior. This was due to restrictions preventing a synagogue being built higher than a church.

During the 18th century, a modest entrance hall was added on the west side of the prayer hall. At the same time a second floor was built over the original women's prayer rooms. At some stage the exterior walls were extended upwards, with fortress style parapets, concealing the roof. The synagogue was last renovated during the period 1967–1972 when the building received a new roof parapet and exterior decoration including decorative painting, the original of which was removed during the 18th century. The work followed an early seventeenth-century engraving and the appearance of other local buildings. Since that time no major works took place in the synagogue.

== Interior ==
A large menorah next to the Aron Kodesh.

The vaults of the synagogue, both in the main hall and in the porches, are richly decorated with stucco in the so-called "Kalish-Lublin" style. Floral motifs including a stylized Tree of Life, crowns, and rosettes are also to be found. The walls used to bear very rich paintings and numerous Hebrew inscriptions. One of the only features remaining that indicates its former use as a Jewish house of prayer is the Aron Kodesh on the Eastern wall which dates from the first half of the 17th century. The lavishly decorated stone carved frame depicts motifs of ritual vessels used at the Temple in Jerusalem and a Torah crown. The octagonal iron bimah was located at the center of the prayer hall and was a gift by Shmuel Barzel in 1787. The prayer hall also boasted a number of majestic candelabras. Today nothing remains either of the bimah or of the candelabra.

== Zamość Synagogue Revitalization Project ==
The Foundation for the Preservation of Jewish Heritage in Poland (FODZ) together with the local authorities, NGOs including the World Monuments Fund and the Israeli Organization of Zamość Jewry, aim to establish in the synagogue a cultural center that will provide housing and support for various local initiatives, as well as the Museum of Jews from the Zamość area. The Foundation for the Preservation of Jewish Heritage in Poland website states:

Together with city's authorities and local non-governmental organizations, we want to renovate the Zamość synagogue and make it a vibrant cultural centre which will serve all the people from Zamość and its environs. The synagogue will also house a Museum of Jews from Zamość and the Zamość region. The Museum is going to present the history of penetration and mutual enrichment of Polish and Jewish culture in the Zamość region. It will also introduce those Jews, who contributed to the intellectual, religious and cultural history of the region. Unfortunately the building of the Zamość synagogue is in a very bad condition and urgently requires a complex restoration. The cost of the restoration works is estimated for a couple of millions PLN; the Foundation is taking steps in order to obtain sufficient funds for renovation works, but it is a tremendous challenge.

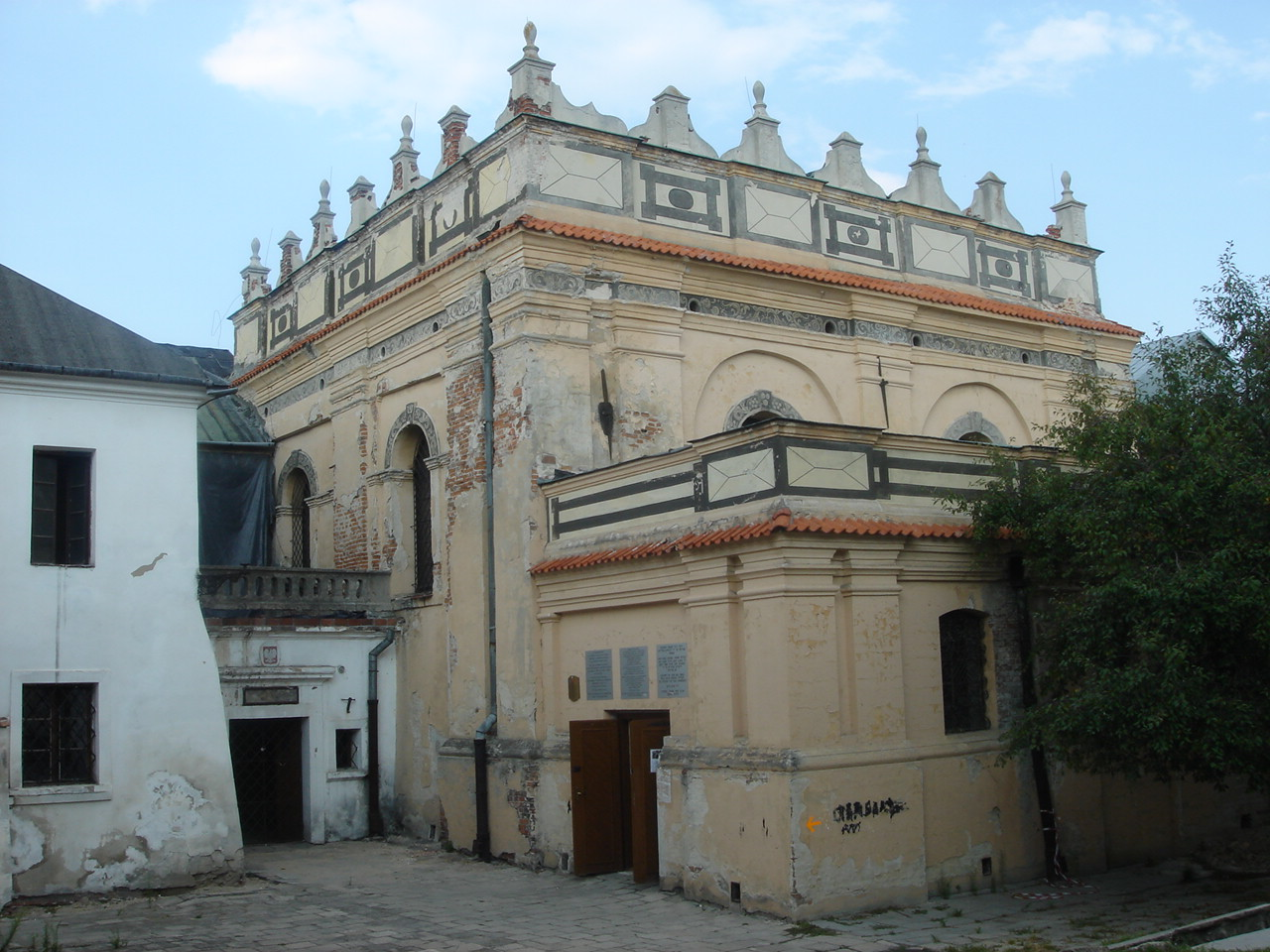
The synagogue in 2006, before its 2010 restoration.

The assigning of new functions to the building, including use as an art gallery, concert and theatre hall, has been deemed necessary to attain funds for necessary conservation works, although this has proved a controversial move. Another organisation, the Yaacov Magid of Dubno Fund (YMDF), established in 2001, names that one of its aims is to "restore the splendid interior of the synagogue to its former glory". Angered by the way the FODZ has utilised the site in order to raise funds, they approached the UN representative of Agudath Israel of America to request intervention in protecting the holy site from "unholy purposes".

In September 2009, restoration work was begun at the hands of the FODZ. The bulk of the funding for the restoration came from the European Economic Area and Norway Grants, which was established by Iceland, Liechtenstein and Norway to support various social and economic projects throughout Europe, as well as from the World Monuments Fund.

== See also ==
- History of the Jews in Poland
- List of active synagogues in Poland
