= Wiktor Nowak =

Polish footballer (born 2004)

- Nowak with Slavia Prague in 2026

Personal information
- Date of birth: 20 September 2004 (age 22)
- Place of birth: Drobin, Poland
- Height: 1.87 m (6 ft 2 in)
- Position: Midfielder

Team information
- Current team: Slavia Prague
- Number: 30

Youth career
- –2016: Pegaz Drobin
- 2016–2020: Legia Warsaw
- 2020–2022: Znicz Pruszków

Senior career*
Years	Team	Apps	(Gls)
2022–2025	Znicz Pruszków	90	(11)
2025–2026	Górnik Zabrze	0	(0)
2025–2026	→ Wisła Płock (loan)	32	(4)
2026–	Slavia Prague	13	(5)

International career^{‡}
2024–2025	Poland U20	6	(1)
2025–	Poland U21	6	(0)
2026–	Poland	6	(0)
- * Club domestic league appearances and goals as of 31 October 2026 ‡ National team caps and goals as of 17 November 2026

Wiktor Nowak (born 20 September 2004) is a Polish professional footballer who plays as a midfielder for Czech First League club Slavia Prague and the Poland national team.

== Early life ==
Nowak was born on 20 September 2004 and is a native of Drobin, Poland.

== Club career ==
=== Early career and Znicz Pruszków ===
Nowak began his career with local side Pegaz Drobin, before joining the youth academy of Legia Warsaw in 2016. In 2020, he moved to Znicz Pruszków's youth setup.

He was promoted to Znicz Pruszków's senior team in 2022, and went on to make 90 league appearances and score 11 goals for the club, helping it achieve promotion from the third tier to the second tier. In 2025, TVP Sport described him as a standout player in the I liga during his time with the club.

=== Górnik Zabrze and loan to Wisła Płock ===
On 25 February 2025, Ekstraklasa club Górnik Zabrze announced Nowak would be joining them in July 2025 on a free transfer. On 16 July 2025, he was loaned to fellow top-flight side Wisła Płock for the remainder of the season, without an option to buy.

=== Slavia Prague ===
On 15 June 2026, Nowak joined Czech First League club Slavia Prague on a four-year deal for a fee of €2.4 million.

== International career ==
Nowak is a Poland youth international. He represented the Poland under-20 team between 2024 and 2025, making six appearances and scoring one goal. During September and November 2025 and March 2026, he played for the Poland under-21 team during their 2027 UEFA European Under-21 Championship qualification campaign.

On 18 September 2026, Nowak received his first call-up to the senior Poland squad for UEFA Nations League matches against Bosnia and Herzegovina, Sweden and Romania. He made his debut on 25 September, entering the pitch at half-time in a goalless draw with Bosnia and Herzegovina at the Stadion Narodowy.

== Career statistics ==
=== Club ===
As of match played 4 November 2026

Appearances and goals by club, season and competition
Club	Season	League			National cup (Note: Includes Polish Cup, Czech Cup)		Europe		Total	
Club	Season	Division	Apps	Goals	Apps	Goals	Apps	Goals	Apps	Goals
Znicz Pruszków	2021–22	II liga	1	0	—		—		0	0
Znicz Pruszków	2022–23	II liga	29	1	0	0	—		29	1
Znicz Pruszków	2023–24	I liga	27	3	1	0	—		28	3
Znicz Pruszków	2024–25	I liga	33	7	1	0	—		34	7
Znicz Pruszków	Total		90	11	2	0	—		92	11
Górnik Zabrze	2025–26	Ekstraklasa	0	0	0	0	—		0	0
Wisła Płock (loan)	2025–26	Ekstraklasa	32	4	1	1	—		33	5
Slavia Prague	2026–27	Czech First League	13	5	1	1	4 (Note: Appearances in UEFA Champions League)	1	18	7
Career total			135	20	4	2	4	1	143	23

=== International ===
As of match played 17 November 2026

Appearances and goals by national team and year
National team	Year	Apps	Goals
Poland	2026	6	0
Total		6	0
