= Church of the Assumption with Saints Catherine and Florian, Gołąb =

Coordinates: 51.2915°N 21.5238°E

Church of the Assumption of the Blessed Virgin Mary with Saints Catherine and Florian
- Kościół Wniebowzięcia Najświętszej Marii Panny, św. Floriana i św. Katarzyny w Gołębiu
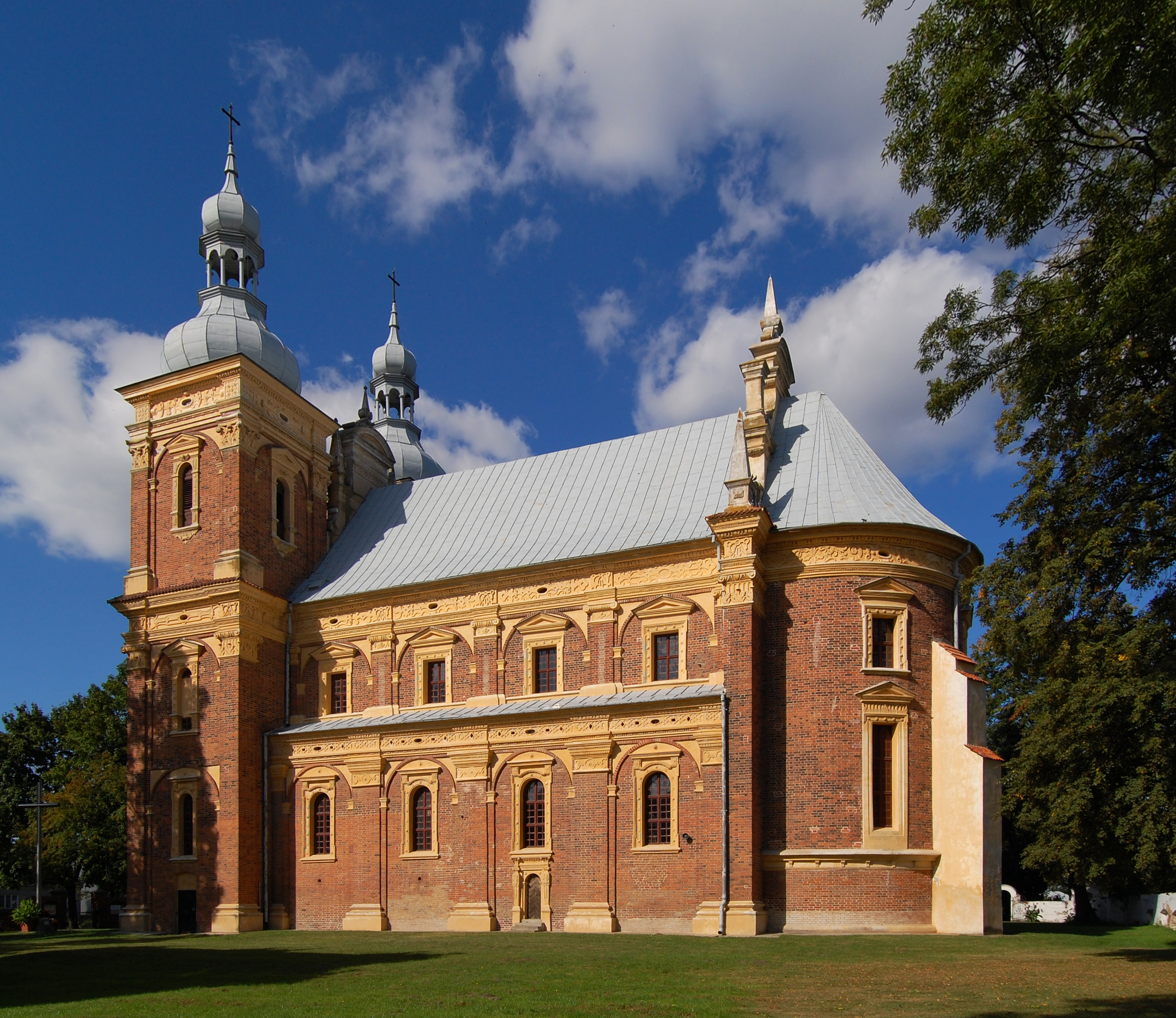
- Church of the Assumption of the Blessed Virgin Mary with Saints Catherine and Florian
- Location: Gołąb
- Country: Poland
- Denomination: Roman Catholic

History
- Founder: Jerzy Ossoliński

Architecture
- Groundbreaking: 1626
- Completed: 1634

Specifications
- Materials: Brick

Administration
- Diocese: Roman Catholic Archdiocese of Lublin
- Parish: Parafia św. Floriana i św. Katarzyny w Gołębiu

The Church of the Assumption with Saints Catherine and Florian in Gołąb, Poland, is an early seventeenth-century church.

The church was founded by Chancellor Jerzy Ossoliński (1595–1650). Built between 1626–1634, the build was consecrated upon completion in 1634. The church's construction was influenced by different architectural movements which entered the Lublin Land (Lubelszczyzna) in the seventeenth century.

== Structure ==
It is difficult to categorise the architectural style of the church. The church's construction was influenced by Italian and Netherlandish architectural movements. Furthermore, the church's construction was strongly influenced by church construction in Kazimierz Dolny (most importantly, the Church of St. John the Baptist and St. Bartholomew, and the townhouses). It is likely that Kazimierz Dolny brick-layers worked on the church. From one side, the church building exhibits Italian architectural movements, whilst from the other, it has a Netherlandish Mannerist architectural style.

The church is orientated, has one nave with four spans. From the east, it is closed-off by a narrowing corpus-nave presbytery in the shape of a half-rounded apse with two scarps. From the west, the façade is crowned with two towers. Between the two towers, the main nave has an attic gable. The church was built using Gothic brick in Polish brickwork.

The church's architectural style is characterised by the linkage of red-bricked walls with a bright, smooth architectural design. The brick elevation contrast ideally with the light-coloured plaster and sandstone architectural feature. The architectural feature has been richly detailed with sculpture, including the: lintel, window and portal frames, pilaster bases and capitals, cornices, and friezes. Furthermore, some of the blind windows, window niches, sacristy, and scarps are plastered.

== See also ==
- Mannerist architecture and sculpture in Poland
- Loreto House, Gołąb
