= Loreto House, Gołąb =

Loreto House
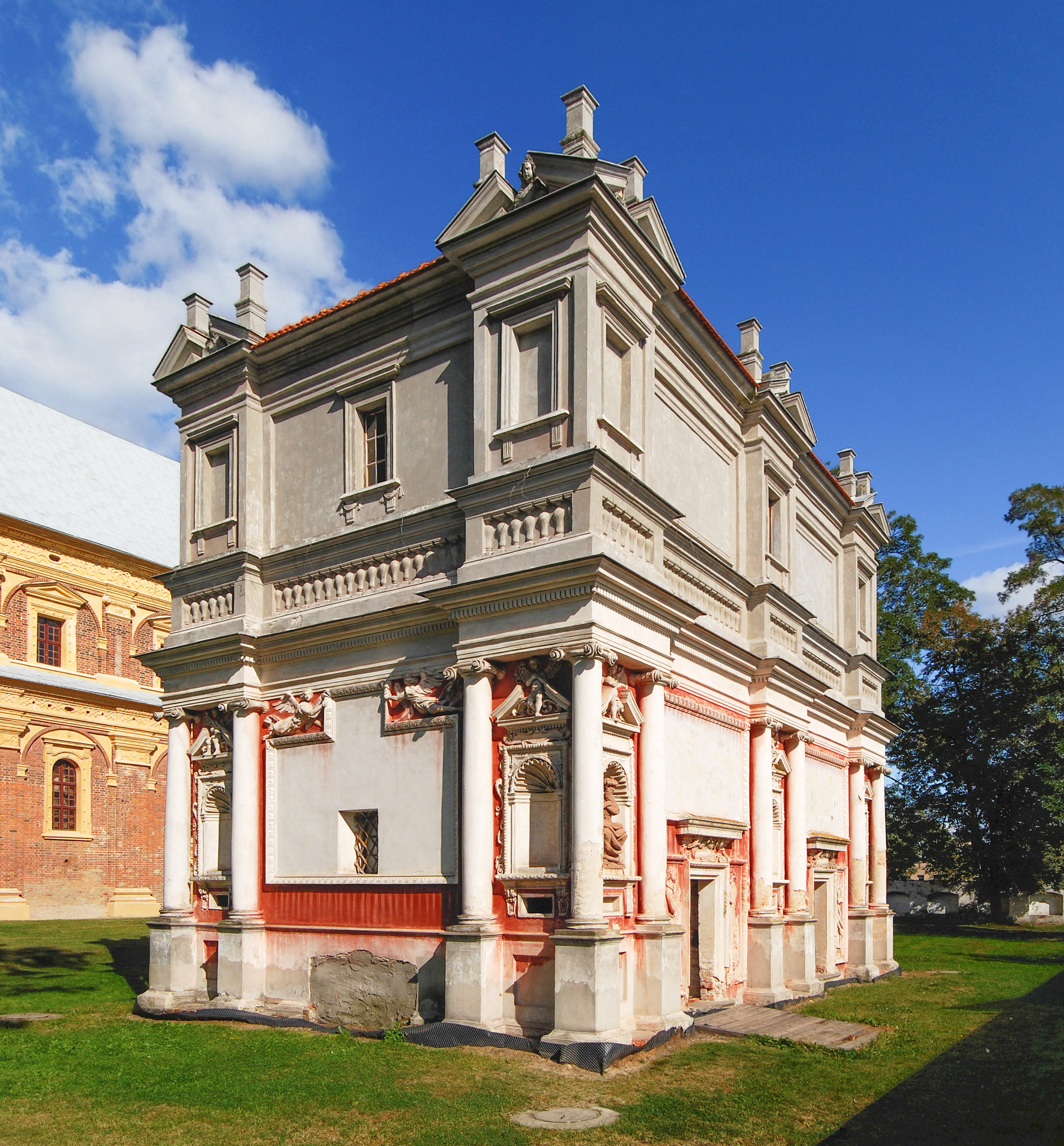
- Exterior of Loreto House
- Interactive map of the Loreto House area

General information
- Architectural style: Mannerism
- Location: Gołąb, Poland
- Construction started: 1634
- Completed: 1638

The Loreto House (Polish: Domek loretański w Gołębiu) in Gołąb, Poland, is a religious building dedicated to the cult of the Blessed Virgin Mary of Loreto. The building illustrates the influence of Italian Mannerism on architecture in Poland. Furthermore, it is the exact replica of the Basilica della Santa Casa in Loreto.

The building was founded by Chancellor Jerzy Ossoliński (1595-1650). Built between 1634-1638, the build was consecrated on the 12 September 1638. The building's named benefactors were Szymon Grzybowski (priest 1616-36) and chancellor Jerzy Ossoliński.

== Structure ==
The building is located close to the southern wall which encircled the cemetery; equally distant from the Church of St. Catherine and St. Florian. The build is built on a rectangular plan. The structure has two condignations: the lower hasa risalit-column features, whilst the upper condignation has risalit-aedicular features.

The Loreto House has a double-walled construction. The exterior wall is stone-brick and plaster. This wall conceals the simple interior walls plastered on the inside. The inside is illuminated by small holes in the plaster and a small barred window, which symbolises the window through which Archangel Gabriel announced to the Blessed Virgin Mary that she would conceive and become the mother of Jesus, the Son of God (the Annunciation).

== Gallery ==
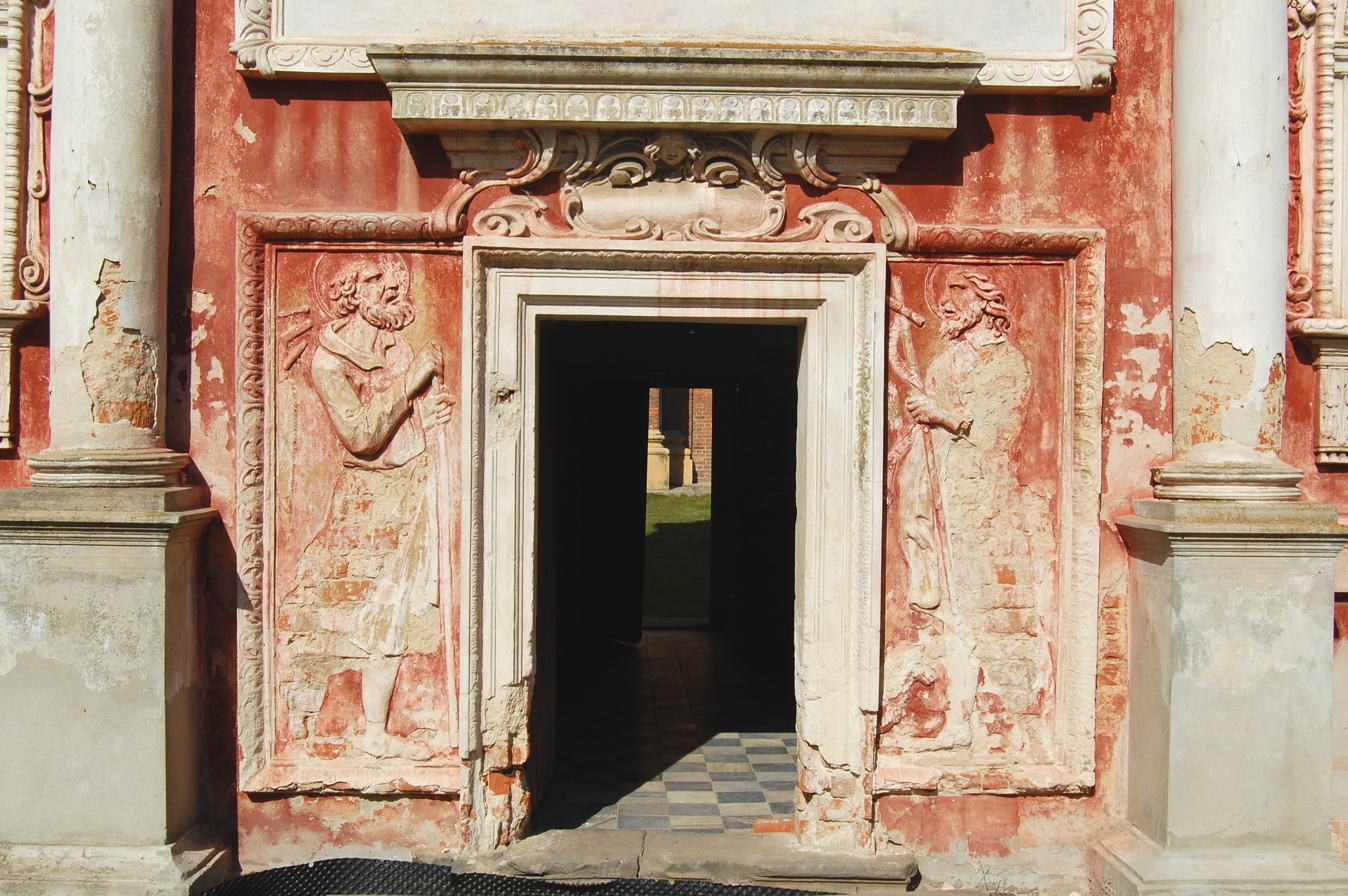
Bas-relief on the portal

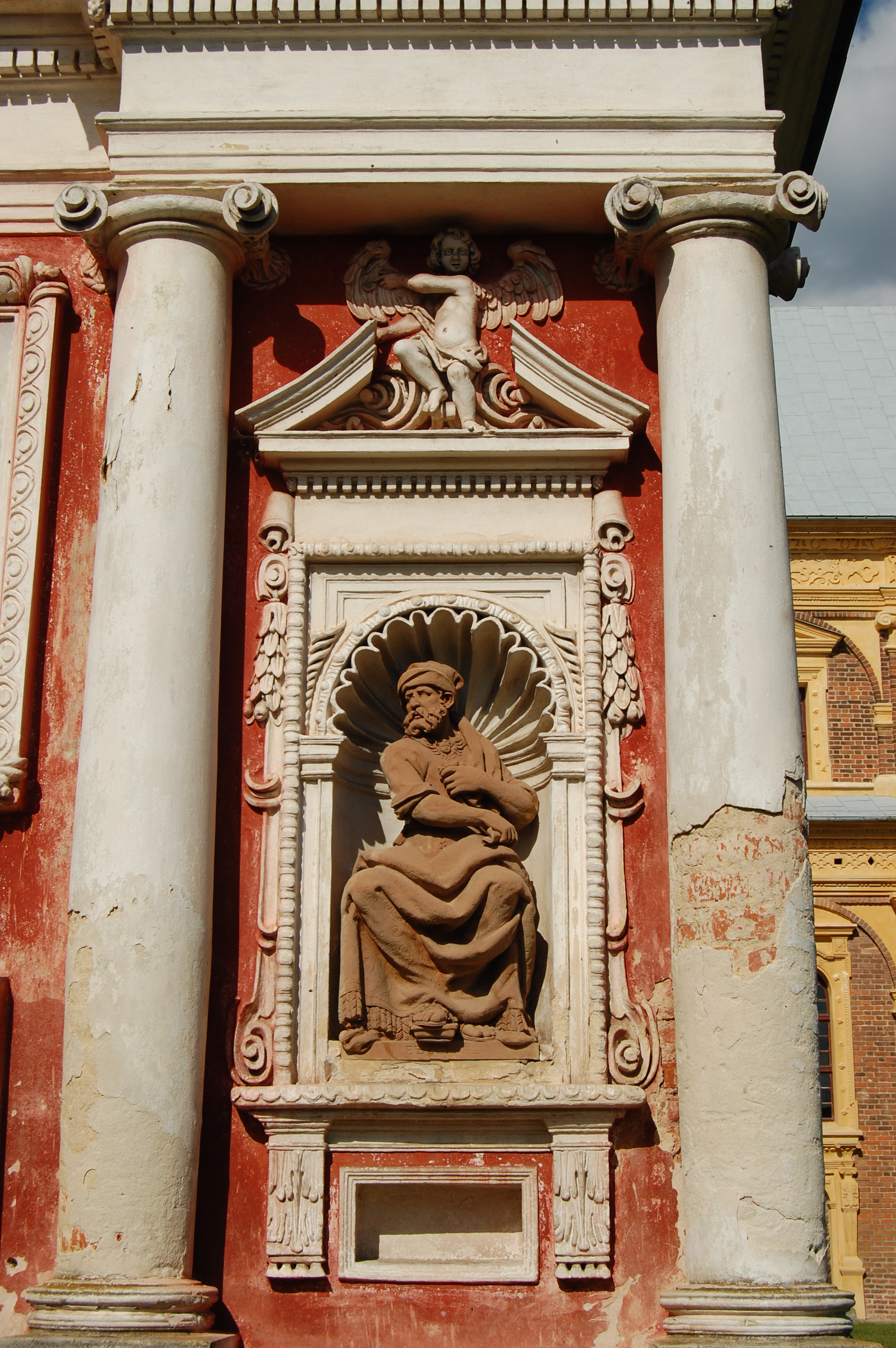
Statue of Ezekiel on the southern wall of the building

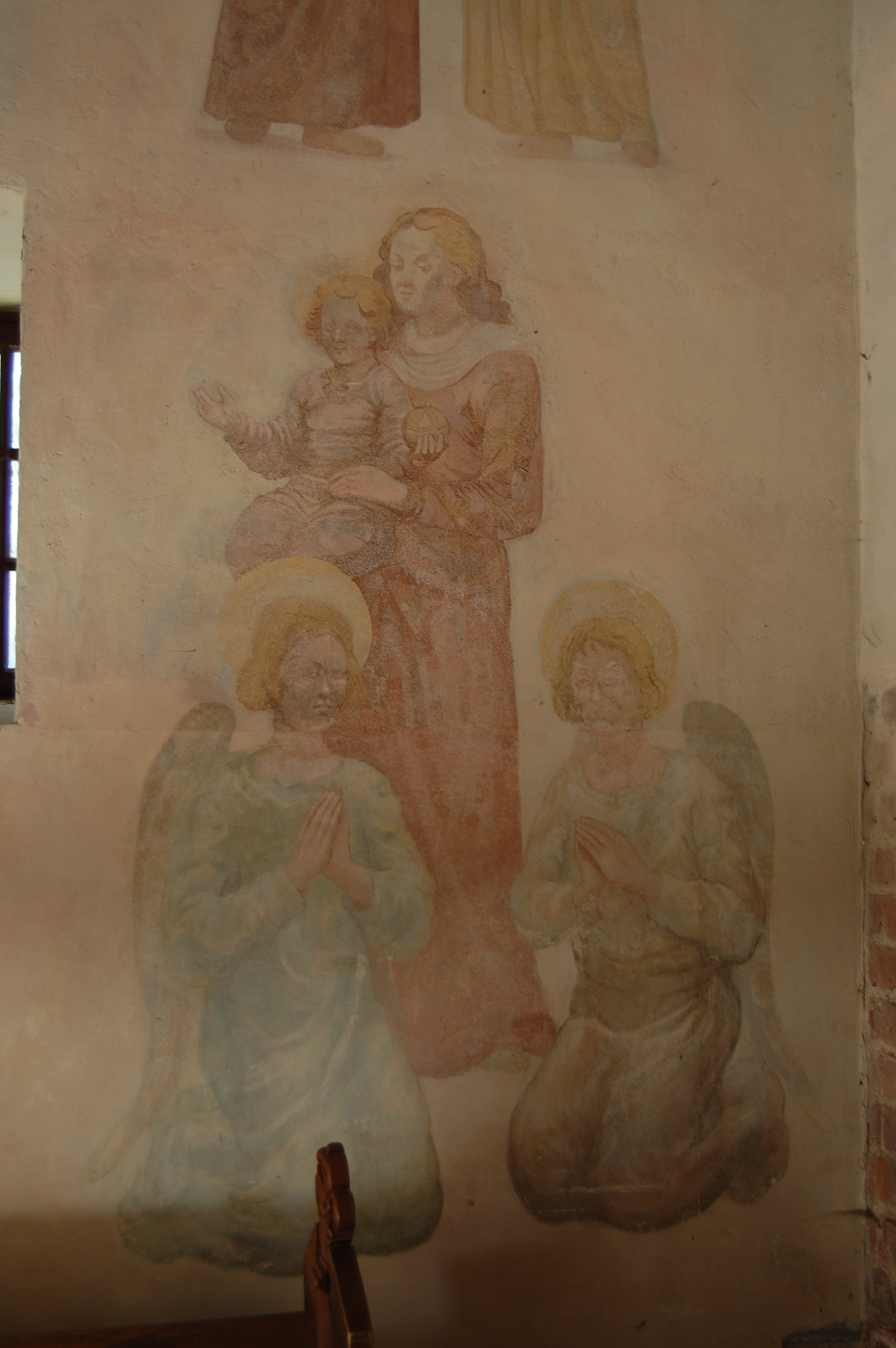
Fresco inside the building

== See also ==
- Mannerist architecture and sculpture in Poland
- Saints Catherine and Florian Church, Gołąb
