= Drobin =

Town in Masovian Voivodeship, Poland

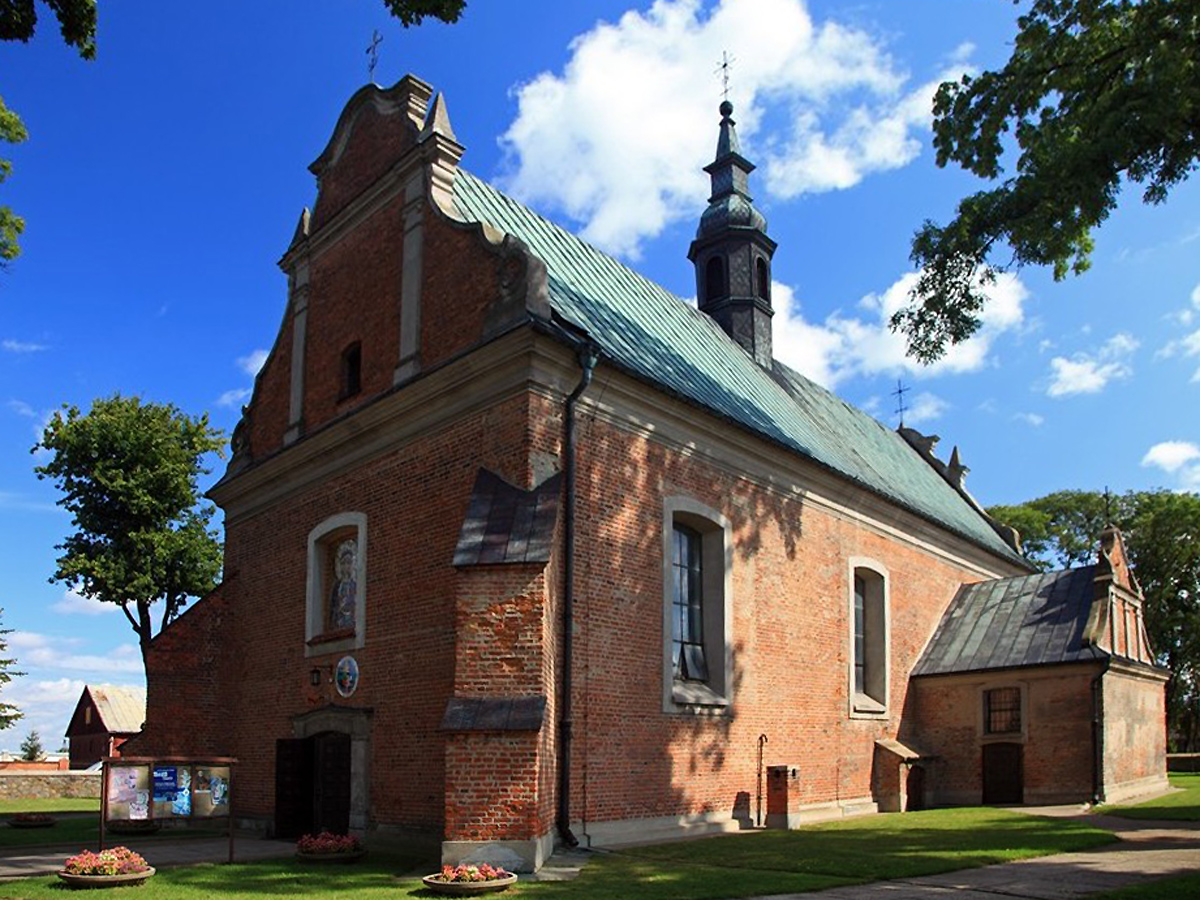
- Our Lady of the Rosary and Saint Stanislaus church in Drobin

- Coat of arms

- Location within Poland
- Coordinates: 52°44′27″N 19°59′21″E
- Country: Poland
- Voivodeship: Masovian
- County: Płock
- Gmina: Drobin
- First mentioned: 12th century
- Town rights: 1511-1869, 1994

Government
  - Mayor: Krzysztof Wielec (PSL)

Area
  - Total: 9.64 km^{2} (3.72 sq mi)

Population (31 December 2021)
  - Total: 2,778
  - Density: 288/km^{2} (746/sq mi)
- Time zone: UTC+1 (CET)
  - Summer (DST): UTC+2 (CEST)
- Postal code: 09-210
- Area code: +48 24
- Car plates: WPL
- Website: https://www.drobin.pl

Drobin [ˈdrɔbʲin] is a town in Płock County, Masovian Voivodeship, in central Poland, with 2,778 inhabitants as of December 2021.

== History ==
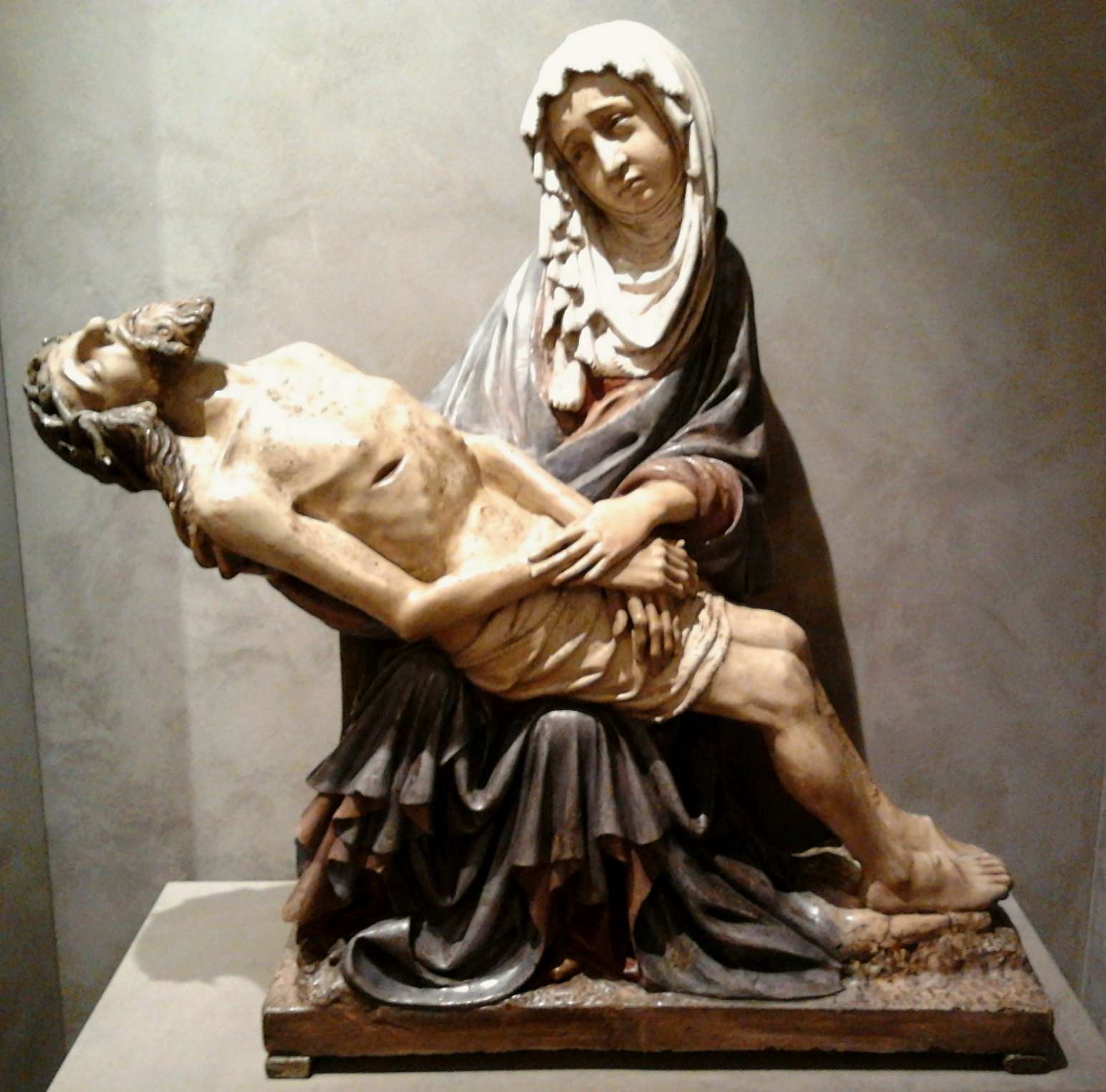
Pietà of Drobin from c. 1430, Diocesan Museum in Płock

The settlement was first mentioned in the 12th century, when it was part of Piast-ruled Poland. It was granted town rights in 1511 under the Jagiellonian dynasty. It was a private town of Polish nobility, administratively located in the Bielsk County in the Płock Voivodeship in the Greater Poland Province of the Kingdom of Poland.

In 1869 Drobin lost its town status. It was restored in 1994.

A battle was fought nearby on August 15, 1920, during the Polish-Soviet War.

During the German occupation of Poland (World War II), the Germans renamed the town Reichenfeld to erase traces of Polish origin, and operated a forced labour camp for Poles and Jews there. Some prisoners of the camp were executed. Several Poles, who were either born or lived and worked in Drobin, were murdered by the Russians in the Katyn massacre in 1940.

== Sports ==
The local football team is Skra Drobin. It competes in the lower leagues.

== Notable people ==
- Wiktor Nowak (born 2004), Polish professional football player
