= Giovanni Battista Trevano =

- Born: Lugano, Switzerland
- Died: 1642; Kraków, Poland
- Occupation: Architect
- Known for: Royal architect for King Sigismund III Vasa

Giovanni Battista Trevano (died in Kraków in 1642) was an architect, builder, and servant of Sigismund III Vasa, one of the most eminent Baroque artists active in the Polish–Lithuanian Commonwealth in the first half of the 17th century.

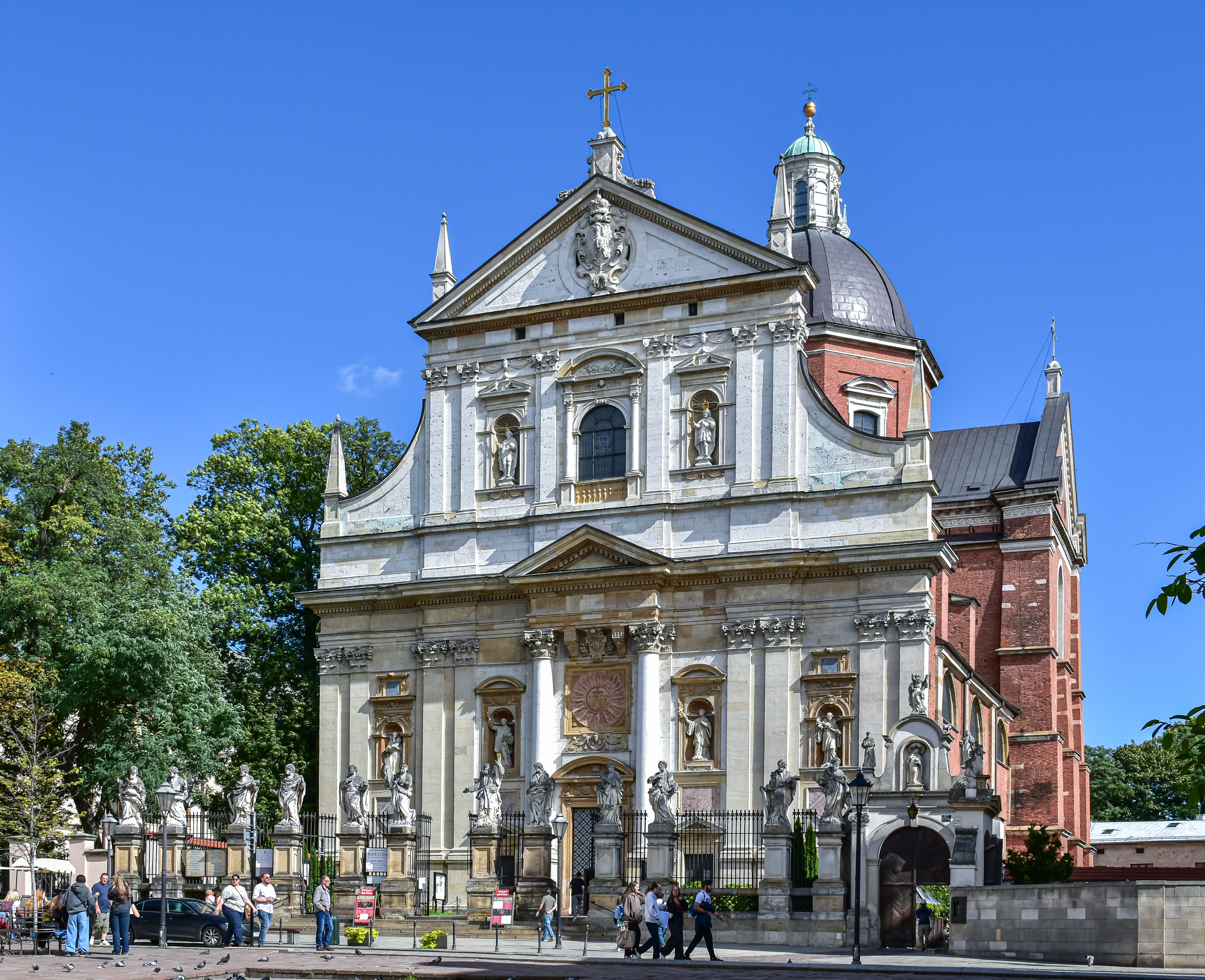
Saints Peter and Paul Church, Kraków

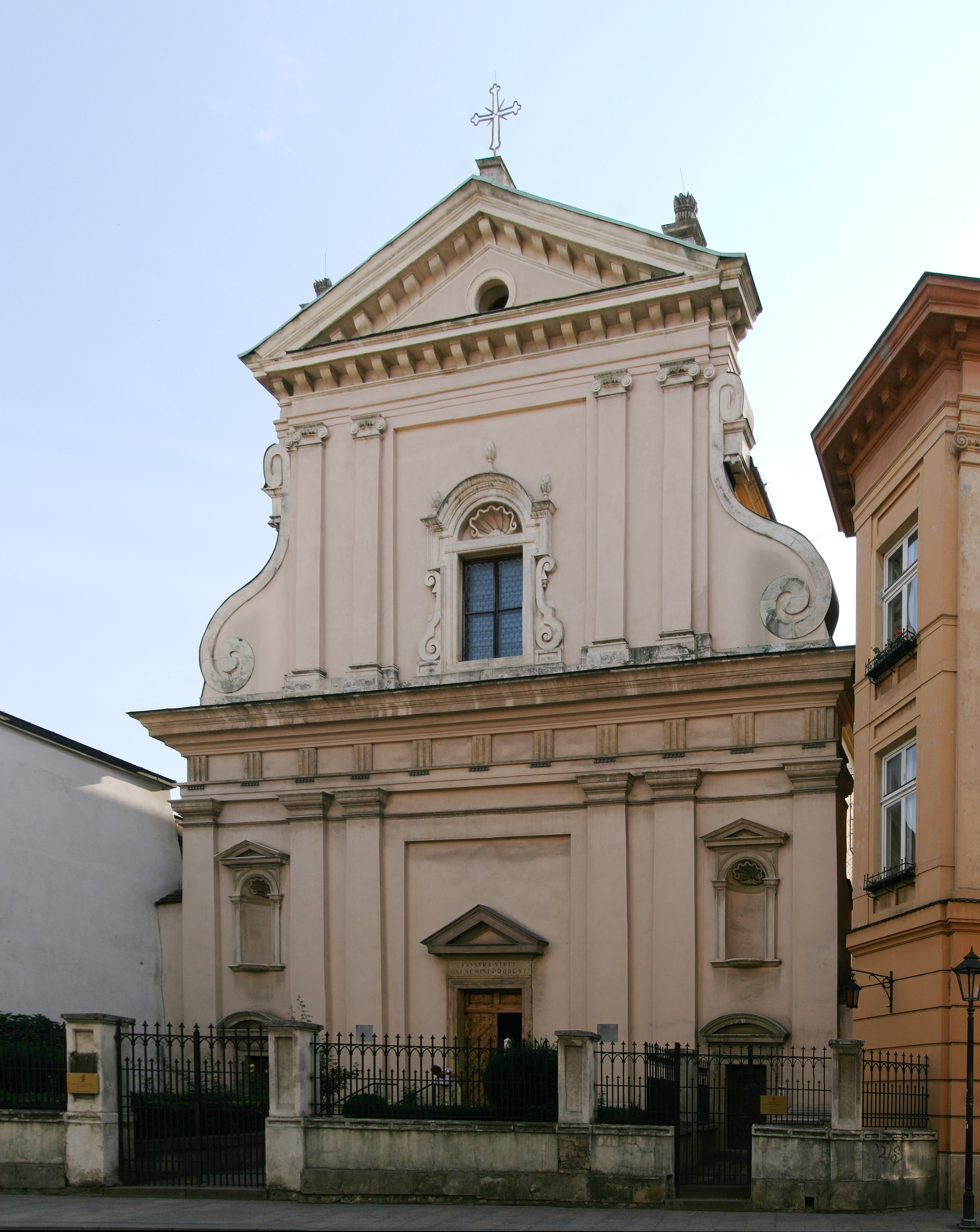
St. Martin Church, Kraków

== Early career ==
Trevano was born in Lugano, Switzerland. started working in Poland around 1600. He was one of the team of architects and craftsmen who rebuilt the Royal Castle in Warsaw, based on the old Gothic castle of the Masovian princes, which had already been completely remodelled by Italian architects in the second half of the sixteenth century. New work was undertaken in the years 1598-1619. He was not alone in this project: Giacomo Rodondo, Paolo del Corte and Mateo Castelli were all involved in remaking the castle into a new Baroque structure, on its imposing site along the bank of the river Vistula. The castle, much altered over the years, was bombed and dynamited by the Nazis as a symbol of Polish culture and was rebuilt in the years 1971–1988 as a national monument.

== Career ==
In Kraków, on the Wawel hill, following a fire in 1595, Trevano rebuilt the state apartments of the Royal Castle for Sigismund III Vasa.

Also on the Wawel hill, in the Cathedral Church of St Wenceslas, which has been repeatedly reconstructed around the 11th-century shrine of St. Stanislaus of Szczepanów, Trevano built the shrine-mausoleum with the crossing dome, supported on four piers (1626–29).

The first Baroque church built in Poland was the Church of St. Peter and Paul on Ulica Grodzka, erected by order of Sigismund III Vasa for the Jesuits in the years 1597—1619. It was designed by Giovanni de Rossi as a cruciform basilica with a domed crossing and completed by Trevano. As with Jesuit churches throughout Catholic Europe, its façade is a close variant of that provided by Giacomo Della Porta for the Church of the Gesù, the Jesuit Mother Church in Rome.

Also in Kraków, St Martin's Church (Kosciol sw. Marcina), was built by Trevano, 1638–44. It has been used for Lutheran worship since 1816. In Ulica sw. Jana, no.12, the Krauze House (Kamienica Krauzowska, now housing the Kraków History Museum) was originally a Gothic building but was remodelled by Giovanni Petrini and Trevano in 1611. The house has a doorway with a segmental pediment.

In Kielce the bishop's palace, built 1637–41 for Jakub Zadzik as a personal monument, is undocumented but is attributed to Trevano, though Tomasso Poncino, another Italian working in Poland but mainly as a building contractor, is credited with carrying out the construction and working out some of the architectural detail. The palace stands out in Poland in retaining its original features virtually unchanged.
