= Gołąb, Puławy County =

Gołąb
- Village
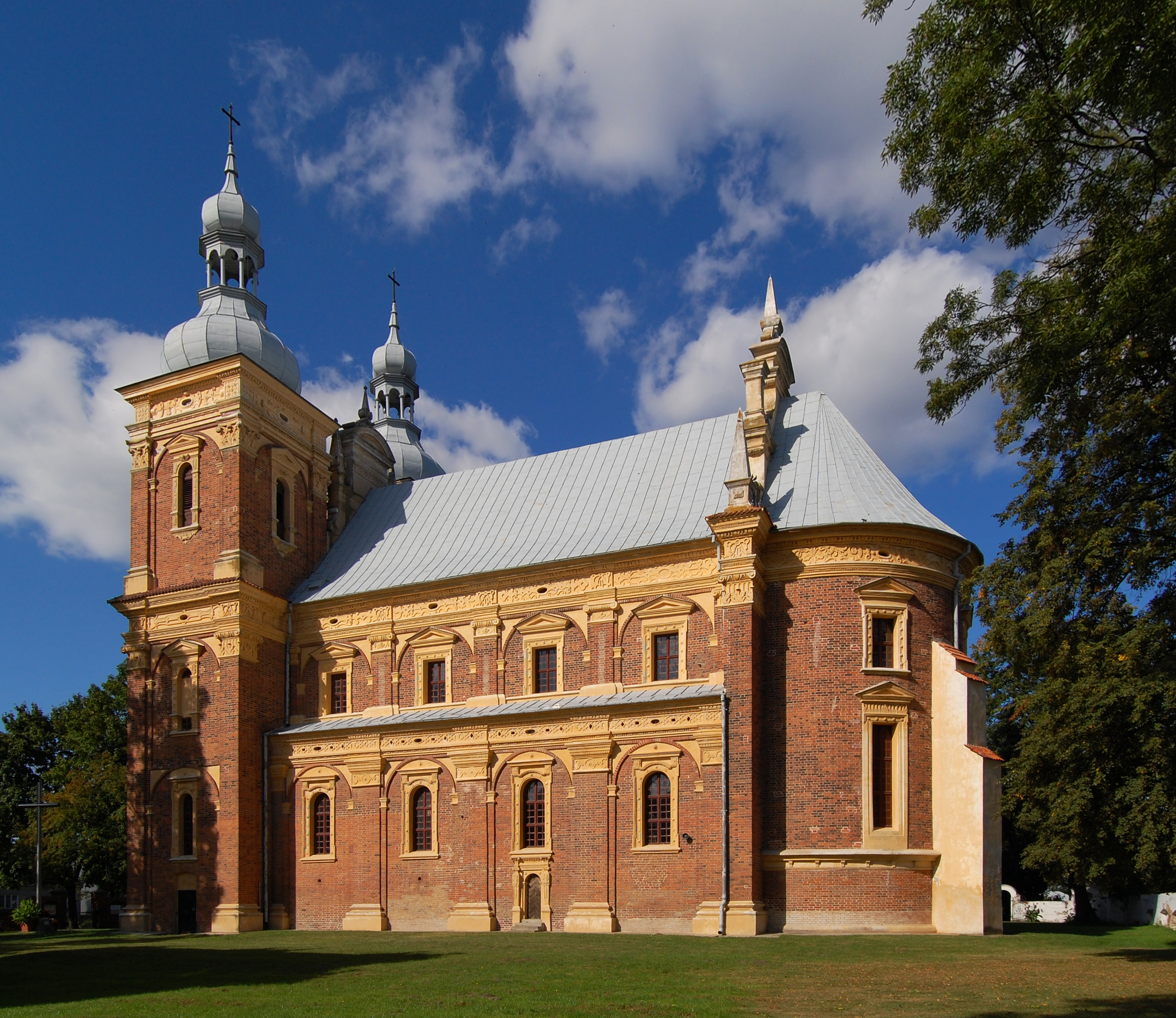

- Location within Poland
- Coordinates: 51°29′13″N 21°52′31″E
- Country: Poland
- Voivodeship: Lublin
- County: Puławy
- Gmina: Puławy
- Elevation: 115 m (377 ft)
- Population: 2,227 (2,011)

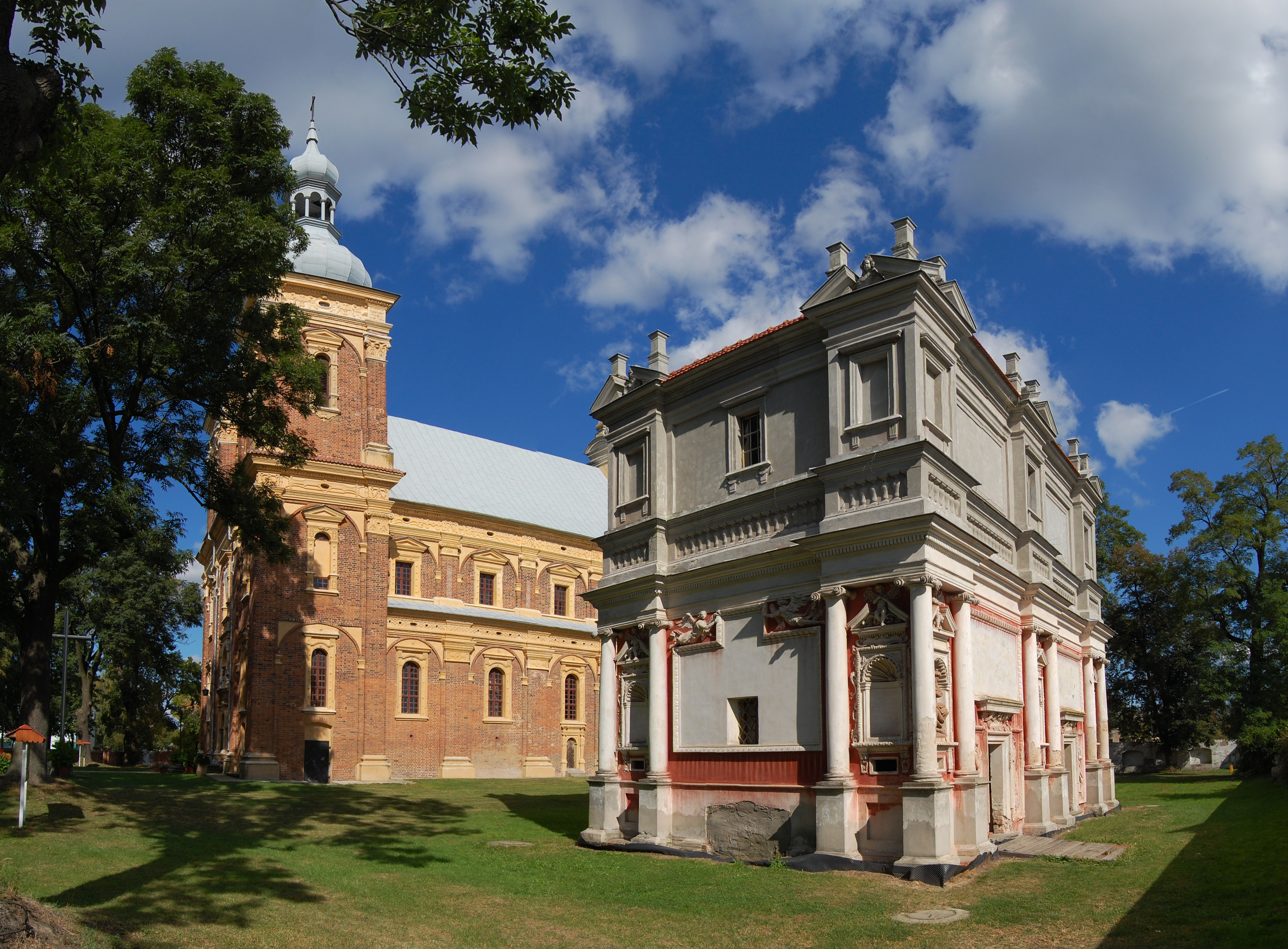
Saints Catherine and Florian Church (left) and Loreto House (right)

Gołąb [ˈɡɔwɔmp] ("pigeon") is a village in the administrative district of Gmina Puławy, within Puławy County, Lublin Voivodeship, in eastern Poland.

== Monuments ==
- Saints Catherine and Florian Church
- Loreto House
- A figure of John of Nepomuk
- Museum of Unusual Bicycles.

== History ==
The first historical mention of the town was in the 12th century. The parish church was constructed between 1628 and 1636, and the Loreto House was constructed between 1634 and 1638.

An invading Swedish army routed a Polish army in the Battle of Gołąb 1656.

The Gołąbska Confederation was found on the 16 October 1672.

In 1939, Germans bombed the airport and a nearby lake. A dozen or so women who were washing clothes and bedding by the lake, were mistakenly recognised by paratroopers and died.
