= Bernardo Morando =

Italian architect active in Poland (1540–1600)

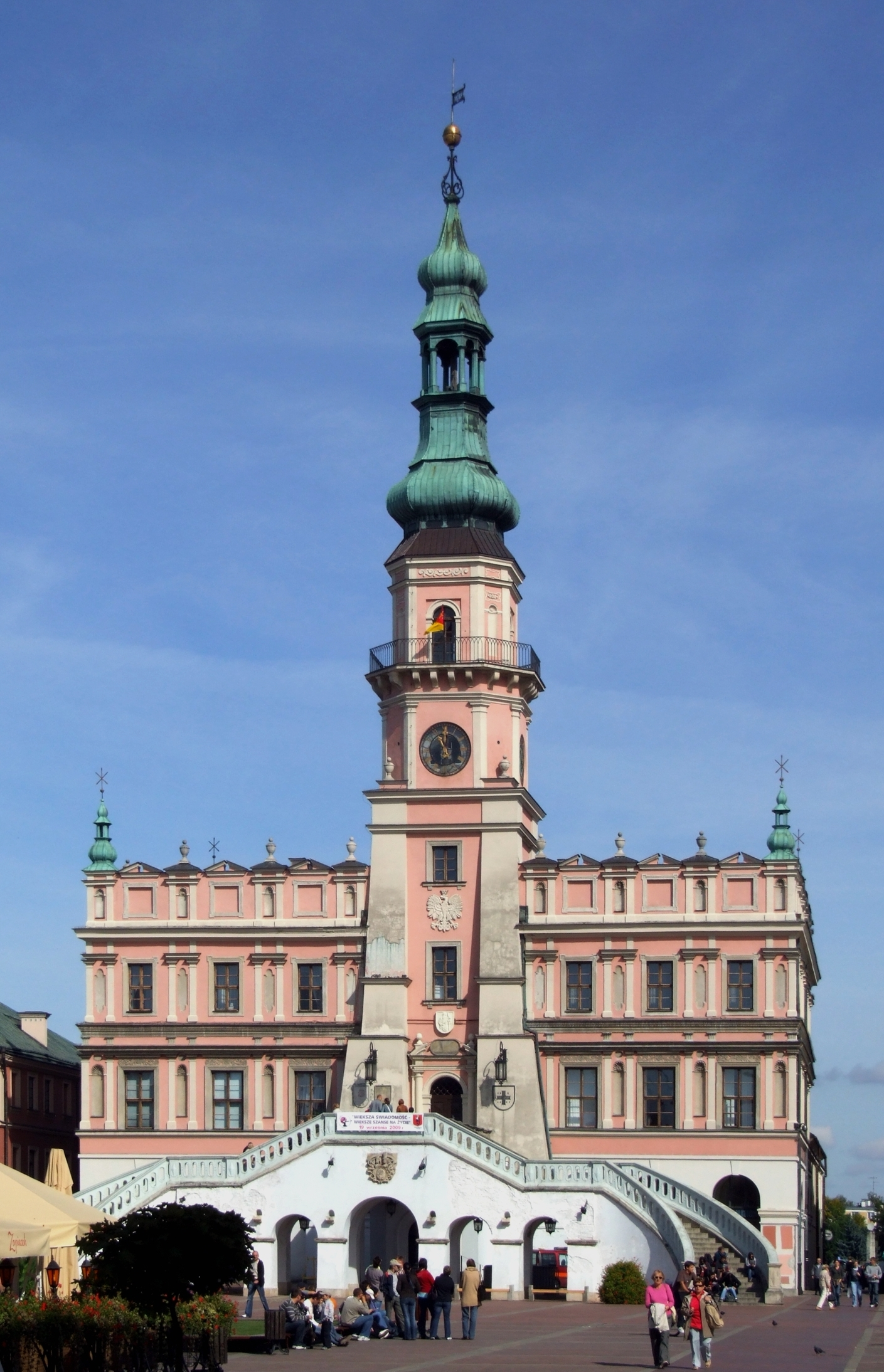
City Hall of Zamość

Bernardo Morando (also known as Bernardino or Morandi; 1540–1600) was an Italian architect from the Republic of Venice, active in Poland. He is notable as the designer of Zamość, which was modelled on Renaissance theories of an ideal city.

== Biography ==
=== Early career ===
Born around 1540 in either Padua or Venice, Morando moved to Poland in 1569, where he started working as an architect. On 1 July 1578 he signed an agreement with Jan Zamoyski, one of the wealthiest men of the Polish–Lithuanian Commonwealth for a project of an ideal city and fortress for the founder. The extreme opulence that Poland's nobility enjoyed during the Renaissance left Poland's elites with not only very large amounts of money to spend, but also motivated them to find new ways to invest their hefty fortunes away from the grasp of the Royal Treasury. Zamoyski, Great Crown Chancellor and Hetman whose financial empire within the Polish Republic spanned 6,400 km^{2} with 11 cities and over 200 villages, in addition to the royal lands he controlled of over 17,500 km^{2} with 112 cities and 612 villages. Zamoyski's estates functioned as a country within a country, and he decided to found the city of Zamość in order to circumvent royal tariffs and duties while also serving as the capital for his mini-state.

=== Constructions ===
Until 1586, Morando prepared plans of the new city, as well as supervised the erection of first notable monuments, including the Lublin Gate, arsenal and Zamoyski's palace. Between 1587 and 1594 he supervised the construction of the Town Hall and the collegiate church, one of the most notable examples of classical Renaissance architecture north of the Alps. It was completed by 1598, two years before Morando's death. Aside from the notable projects, throughout his stay in Zamość Morando also supervised the construction of burgher houses and the notable star-shaped fortifications. Zamość was so successful that 11 years after its construction began it had only 26 empty lots left. However, it was not until the 1620s when his successor, Andrea dell'Aqua, completed the fortress. During the following years Zamość Academy and numerous churches were built.

Apart from the city of Zamość, Morando also prepared plans of construction of two smaller fortified towns: Tomaszów Lubelski and Szarogród in Podolia, in what is now Ukraine. It is also probable that he created the scenery for Jan Kochanowski's Odprawa posłów greckich, the first Polish drama staged during Zamoyski's marriage to Krystyna née Radziwiłł.

=== Later life ===
For his merits to Zamoyski, he was given two large houses in Zamość. Between 1591 and 1593 he was also the mayor of that city and was ennobled. He married a certain Katarzyna, with whom he had six children. His successors used the Polish name of Morenda and used the Mora Coat of Arms granted to him. He died in Zamość in 1600 and was buried in the collegiate church he built not so long before.

One of his sons, Gabriel Morenda, became a doctor of science at the University of Padua and returned to Zamość, where he became the mayor and judge. He was also a professor of mathematics at the Zamość Academy which was built according to his father's plans.
