= Tarło (surname) =

Tarło is a Polish surname, and may refer to any of the following:

- Adam Tarło (1713–1744), Polish nobleman
- Aleksander Piotr Tarło
- Andrzej Tarło (died c. 1531), Polish nobleman
- Anna Tarło
- Barbara Tarło
- L. Beverly Tarlo
- Jadwiga Tarło (XVI-?)
- Jan Tarło (d. 1572), Polish nobleman
- Jan Tarło (1527–1587)
- Jan Tarło (XV-1550)
- Jan Tarło (1684–1750)
- Jan Karol Tarło (1593–1645), Polish nobleman
- Karol Tarło (1639–1702), polish governor
- Paweł Tarło (died 1565), Polish nobleman
- Stanisław Tarło (died c. 1599), Polish nobleman
- Zygmunt Tarło (1561–1628), Polish-Lithuanian nobleman

== See also ==
- Tarło family
