= Jan Tarło =

Jan Tarło may refer to the following Polish noblemen:

- Jan Tarło (d. 1550), standard-bearer of Lwów
- Jan Tarło (d. 1572), cup-bearer of the Crown, starost of Pilzno
- Jan Tarło (1527–1587), voivode of Lublin, starost of Łomża and Pilzno
- Jan Tarło (1684–1750), voivode of Lublin and Sandomierz, starost of Medyka, Sokal, Jasło and Grabowiec
