= Tarło family =

Polish noble family

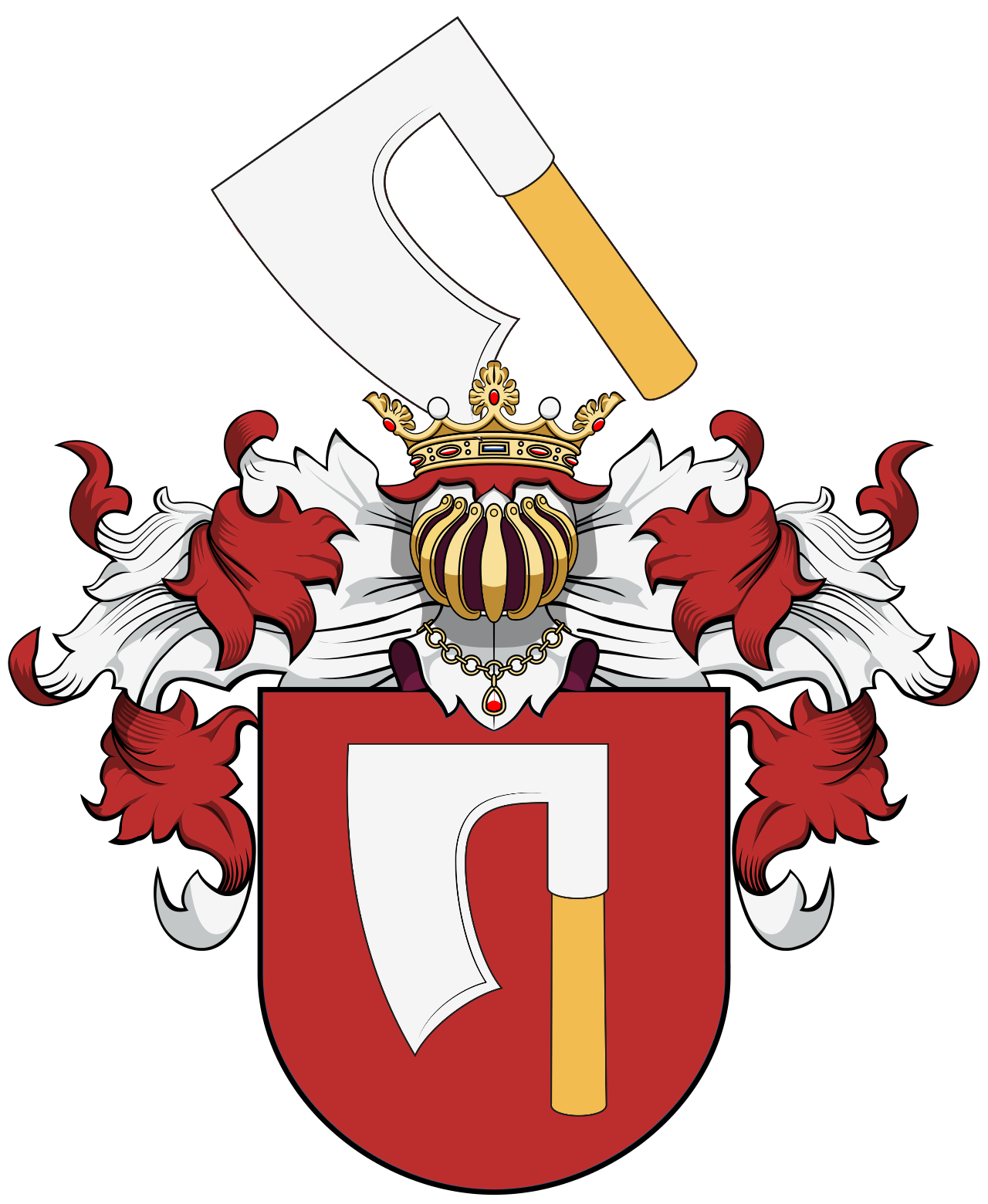
Topór coat of arms

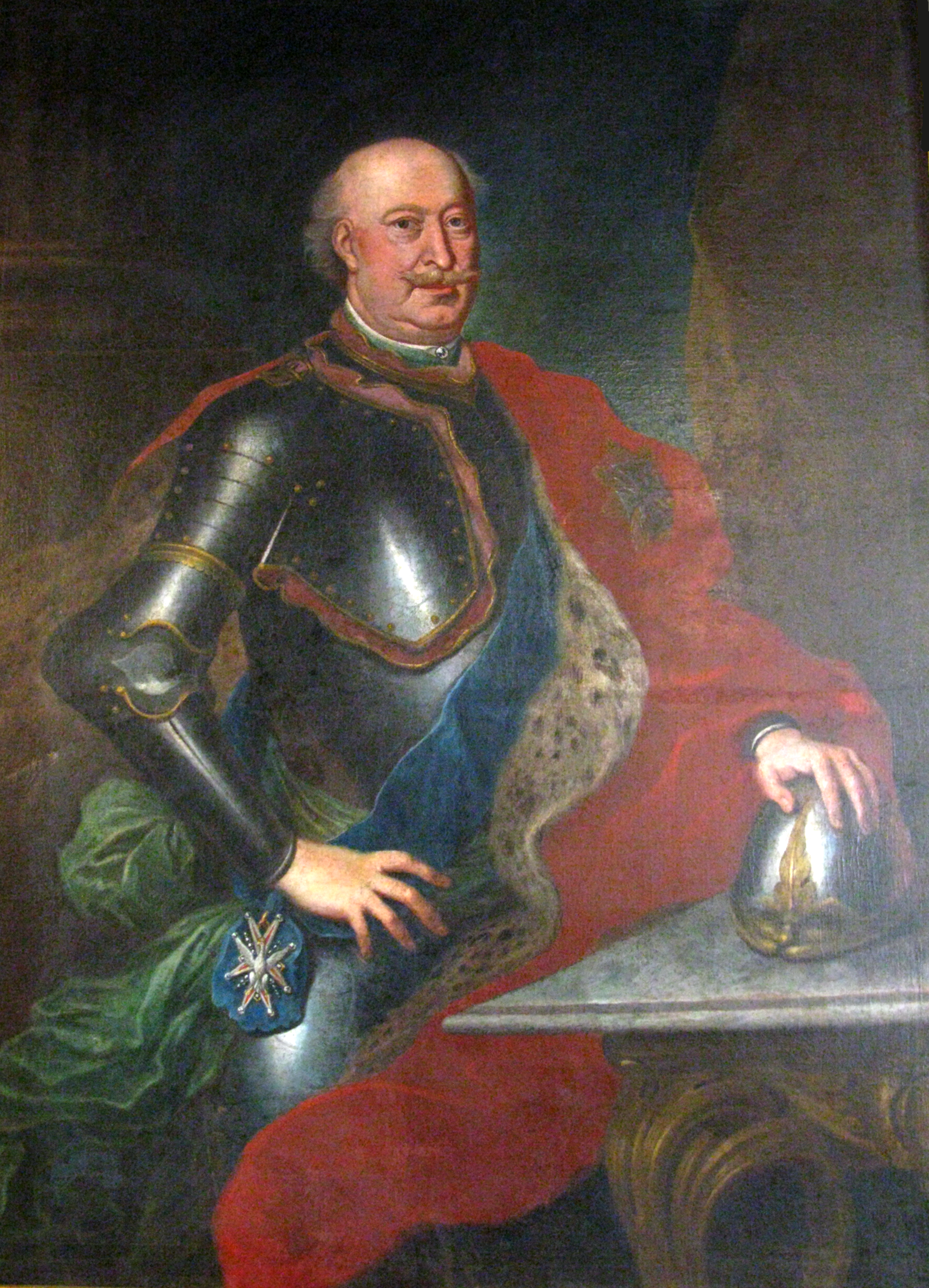
Jan Tarło (1684–1750)

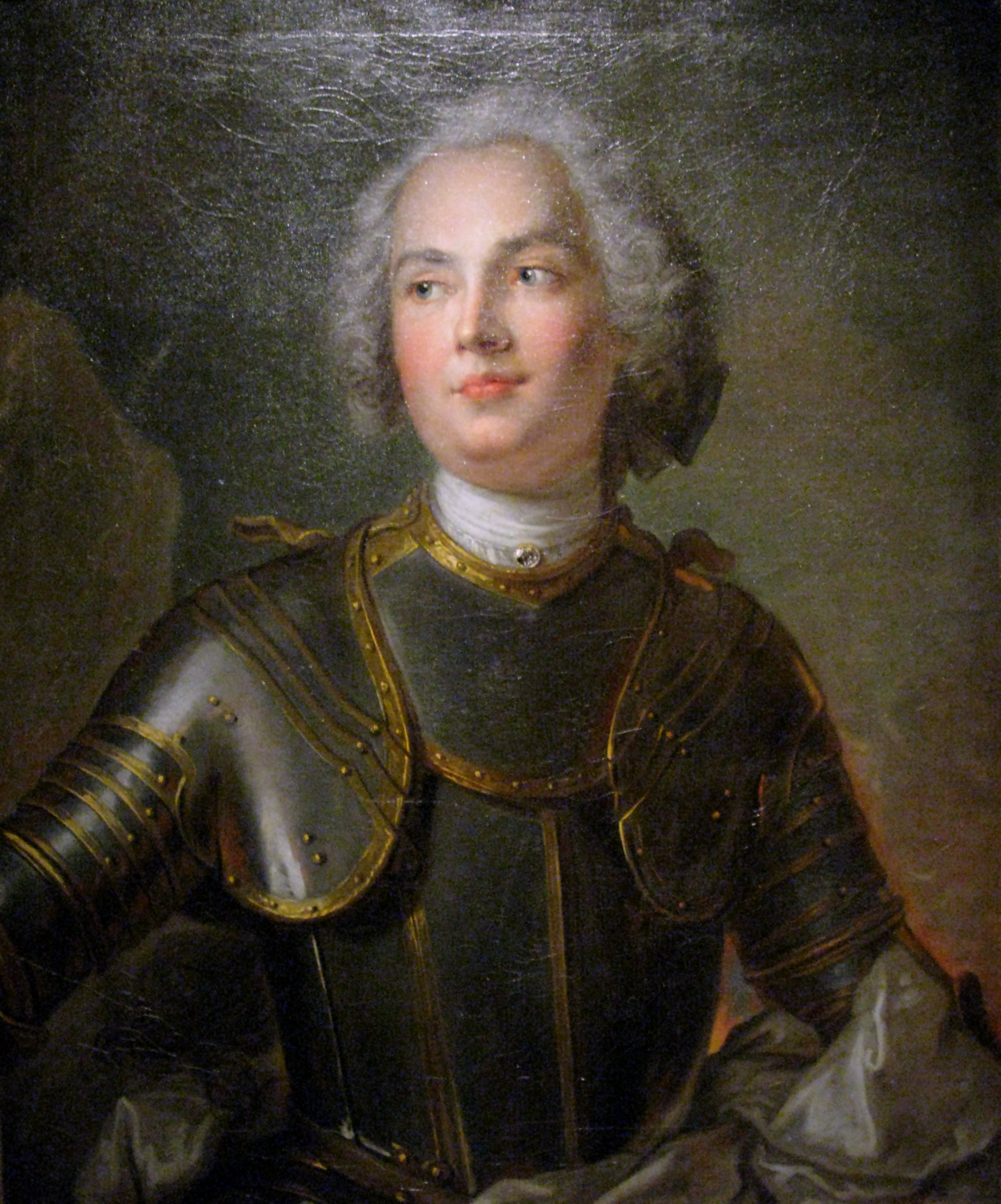
Alleged portrait of Adam Tarło (1713–1744)

The Tarło family (Plural: Tarłowie) was an old Polish magnate (szlachta) family. The seats of the family in the 16th century were, among others: Laszki Murowane near Chyrów, Sambor, Dębowiec near Jasło, Samoklęski and Potok near Krosno.

== Coat of arms ==
The family used the Topór coat of arms.

== Notable members ==
- Adam Tarło (1713–1744) – Voivode of Lublin, rotmistrz pancerny
- Adam Tarło (1708–1772) – General
- Adam Tarło (died 1710) – Voivode of Smoleńsk
- Adam Tarło (died 1719) – Voivode of Lublin
- Andrzej Tarło (died 1531) – Enseign of Lwów
- Anna Tarło – wife of Hieronim Chodkiewicz
- Aleksander Tarło (1639–1683) – Castellan of Zawichojsk
- Barbara Tarło, (c.1636–1689) – wife of Jerzy Sebastian Lubomirski
- Jadwiga Tarło – wife of Hieronim Jarosz Sieniawski
- Jadwiga Tarło (c. 1560–1614) – wife of Jerzy Mniszech, mother of Maryna Mniszchówna Tsarina of Russia
- Jan Joachim Tarło (1658–1732) – Bishop of Kijów (Kyiv, also Kiev) and Poznań
- Jan Kanty Tarło (1790–1855) – owner of Sułkowice and Zalesie
- Jan Karol Tarło, (c. 1593–1645) – Castellan of Wiślica and starost of Olsztyn and Zwoleń
- Jan Tarło (?-1572) – chorąży of Lwów
- Jan Tarło (died 1550) – Crown Cupbearer and Vice-cupbearer
- Jan Tarło (1527–1587) – Voivode of Lublin
- Jan Tarło (1684–1750) – Voivode of Lublin and of Sandomierz
- Katarzyna Tarło (c.1535 – c.1582) – mother of Voivode of Ruthenia Jan Daniłowicz
- Karol Tarło (1639–1702) – Crown Vice-chancellor, Voivode of Lublin
- Mikołaj Tarło (died 1578) – courtier
- Mikołaj Tarło (died 1571) – secretary of the King, Vice-cupbearer of the Queen Barbara Radziwiłł
- Mikołaj Bartłomiej Tarło (died 1716) – Bishop of Poznań
- Paweł Tarło (died 1565) – canon of Kraków and Archbishop Lwów
- Paweł Tarło (died 1553) – magistrate of Lwów
- Paweł Tarło (died 1722) – canon of Gnieźno, Poznań, Kraków, Bishop of Livonia and Poznań
- Piotr Aleksander Tarło (c. 1565–1649) – Castellan of Lublin, Voivode of Lublin
- Stanisław Tarło (1480–1544) – secretary of King Zygmunt I Stary, Bishop of Przemyśl
- Stanisław Tarło (died 1530) – Ochmistrz of Queen Elżbieta
- Stanisław Tarło (1639–1705) – Voivode of Lublin
- Stanisław Tarło (died 1599/1601) – Starost of Sochaczew and Zwoleń
- Teofilia Tarło (c. 1595–1635) – wife of Janusz Ostrogski
- Zaklika Tarło ze Szczekarzewic (died 1465/66) – Crown Craver, envoy of King Władysław II Jagiełło
- Zygmunt Tarło (c. 1561–1628) – Ensign of Przemyśl

== Palaces ==
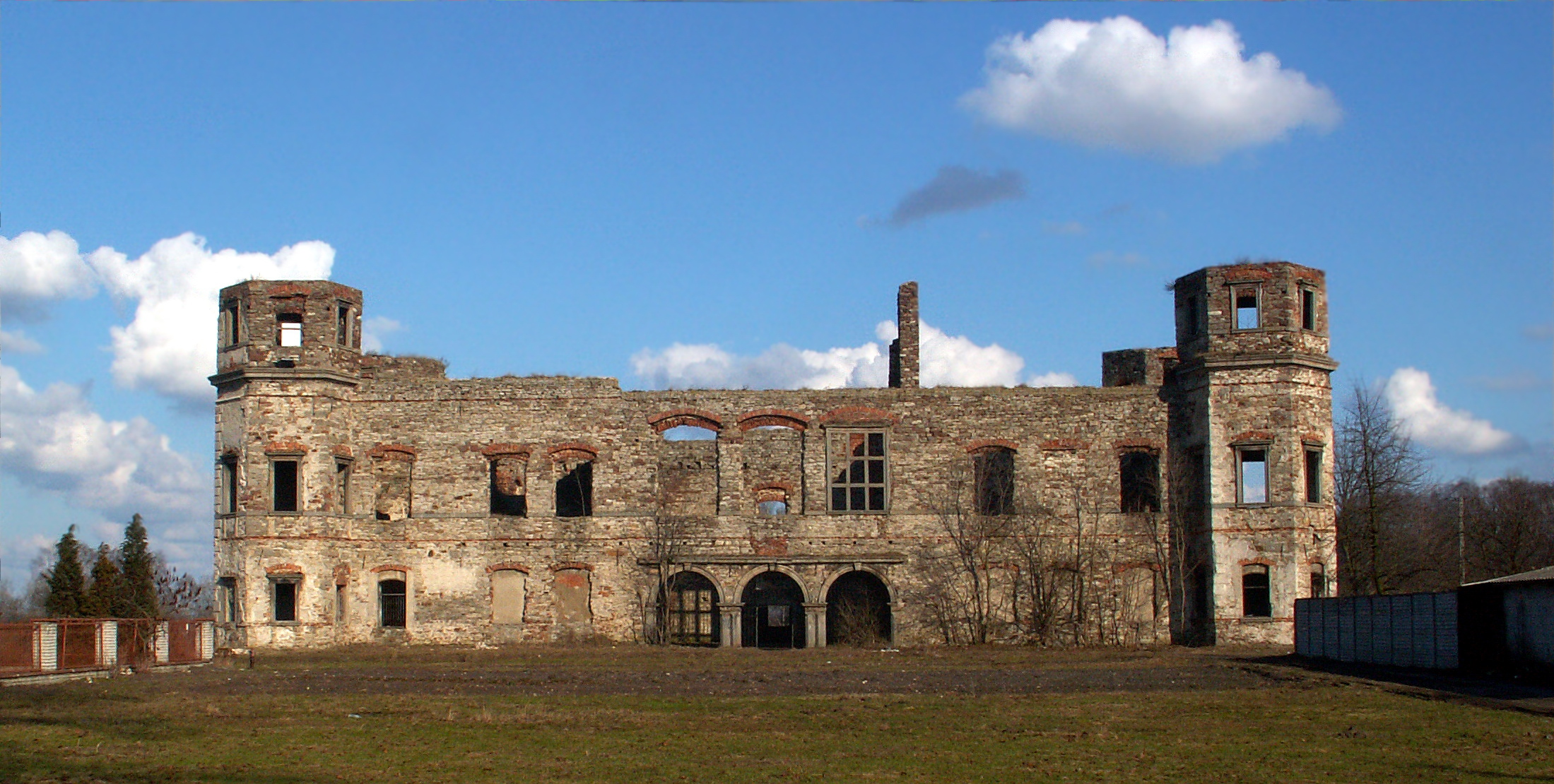
Ruins of the Tarło Palace inPodzamcze
