= Ruchana Medina White =

Ruchana Medina White (born Nili Ruchana Miedzinski on November 9, 1945) was the first person born in Kibbutz Nili, a kibbutz established in Pleikersdorf, Germany. Her preserved photography collection is displayed at the United States Holocaust Memorial Museum.

== Family ==
White's father, Noach Miedzinski (later Bernard Medine), was born in Poland, the youngest of eight siblings and the son of a Hasidic rebbe. During World War II, Miedzinski joined the Polish military during which time he was captured and imprisoned in the Warsaw Ghetto. As an active contributor to the Zionist underground, Miedzinski was caught, lined up in front of a synagogue and shot, though he survived.

After surviving, he was again recaptured and placed in Gross-Rosen concentration camp, where he met his future wife, Sara Feldberg. Feldberg was a Polish Jew who grew up in the town of Zwoleń. She was the only surviving child of her family, and together with Miedzinski, joined the kibbutz seeking to rebuild their lives in post-World War II Germany.

== Kibbutz Nili ==
Kibbutz Nili was a kibbutz established on December 8, 1945 by Holocaust survivors on a 350-acre estate once owned by Nazi propagandist Julius Streicher.

It was part of the Youth Aliyah movement, a Jewish organization aimed at rescuing young Jews from Nazi-occupied Europe and relocating them to Mandatory Palestine.

Named after the Zionist motto "Netzach Yisrael Lo Yishaker" ("The eternity of Israel will not lie"), Kibbutz Nili also humorously went by the name Streichershof after the former Nazi propagandist owner of the land now settled by the kibbutz.

Situated just outside of Nuremberg, it served as an agricultural hub, intended to exemplify the tenacity of Holocaust survivors in reviving life and furthering Zionist objectives.

== See also ==
- History of Israel
