= Stanisław Chomętowski =

Polish politician, military commander and diplomat

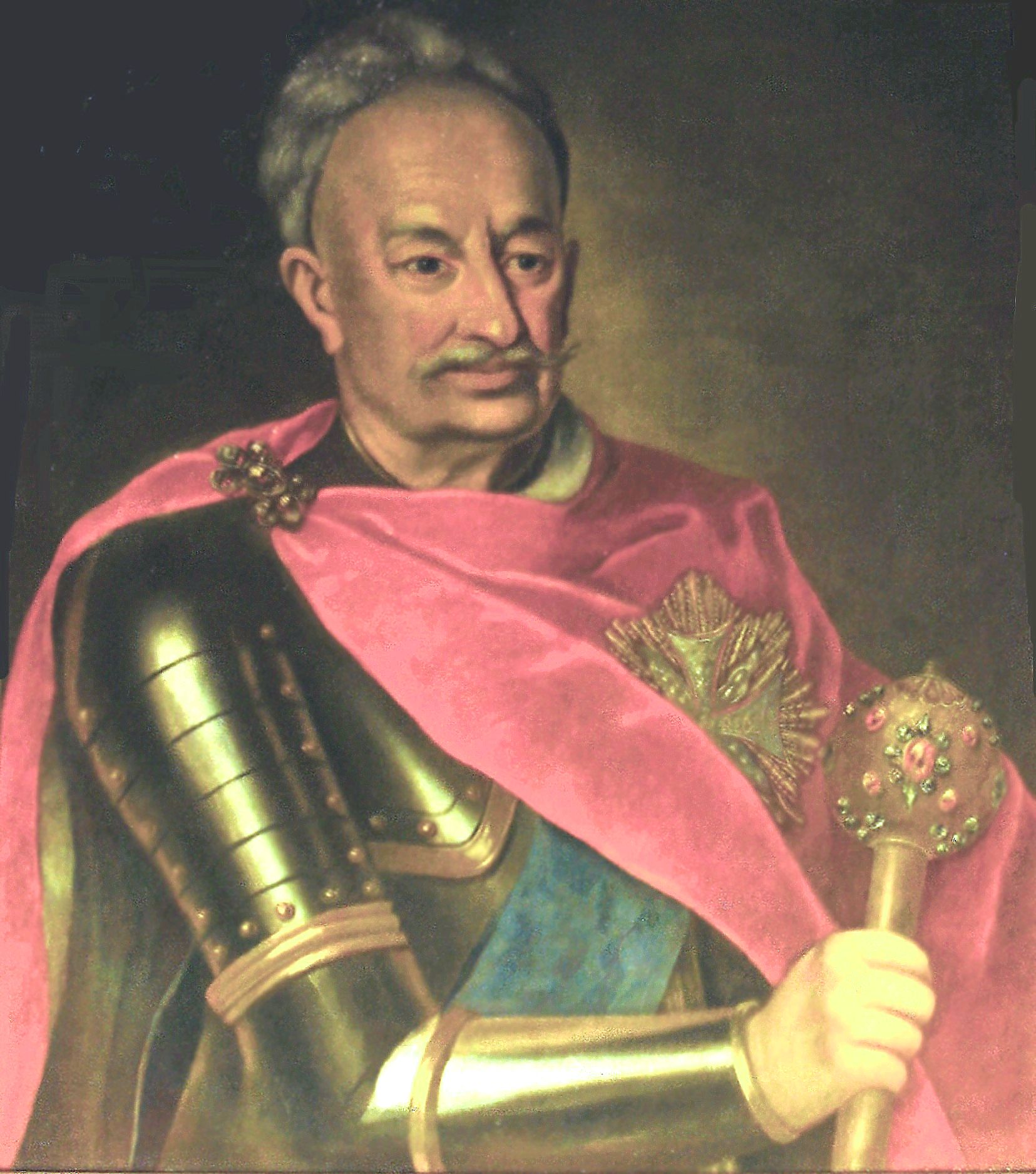

Stanisław Chomętowski (1673–1728) was a Polish politician, military commander and diplomat, notable as one of the most reliable supporters of Polish king August II the Strong.

Born to a non-notable szlachta family, in 1696 he rose to the office of the starost of Radom. A veteran of the Great Northern War, after the abdication of August II the Strong he supported his return. During the Sandomierz Confederation of 1704 he was elected the Marshal of the Sejm and gained much support among the gentry. He also tried to gain Russian support for the cause of August II the Strong. In the following years he also became the starost of Zwoleń (1706), Drohobycz and Złotoryja (1708), which significantly added to his fortune. Since 1706 he was also the voivode of Masovian Voivodship, one of the most populous and rich lands of the Polish–Lithuanian Commonwealth.

Lis coat of arms used by Stanisław Chomętowski

In 1712 he was dispatched as ambassador to the Ottoman Empire to negotiate the return of Swedish king Charles XII to Sweden. For this mission he was awarded with 25,000 talers, an astronomically high amount of money by those times' standards. In 1717 he signed the constitution of the Silent Sejm. For his support for the king, in 1725 he was made the Court Marshal of the Crown. The following year he became the Field Crown Hetman and held that post until his death in 1728.
