= Stanisław Tarło =

Polish noble (died 1599/1601)

- Coat of arms: Topór
- Born: 16th century
- Died: 1599/1601
- Noble family: Tarło
- Consort: Barbara Dulska
- Issue: Jan Karol Tarło; Paweł Tarło
- Father: Jan Tarło
- Mother: Regina z Malczyc

Stanisław Tarło (died 1599/1601) was a Polish noble (szlachcic).

The son of the chorąży of Lwów Jan Tarło and Regina z Malczyc, he married Barbara Dulska, probably no later than 1593. They had two children together, Jan Karol Tarło and Paweł Tarło.

He was starost of Sochaczew and Zwoleń.

== Bibliography ==
- Orgelbrand, Samuel (1863) [1859]. Encyklopedja powszechna (in Polish). Vol. 13. Orgelbrand.
- Tchórzewska-Kabata, Halina (2010). Pod znakiem światła: Biblioteka Ordynacji Krasińskich: 1844-1944 (in Polish). Biblioteka Narodowa. ISBN 9788370097776.
- Polskie Towarzystwo Heraldyczne (2001) [1910]. Rocznik Polskiego Towarzystwa Heraldycznego [Yearbook of the Polish Heraldry Society] (in Polish and Latin). Vol. 5–7. Nakł. Polskiego Towarzystwa Heraldycznego.
- Zurek, Werner (2021). The Noble Polish Family Baran (Aries) Die Adlige Polnische Familie Baran (Widder). Books on Demand. ISBN 9783753435183.
