= Kraków Bishops Palace, Kielce =

Building in Kielce, Poland

Palace of the Kraków Bishops National Museum
- Pałac Biskupów Krakowskich w Kielcach
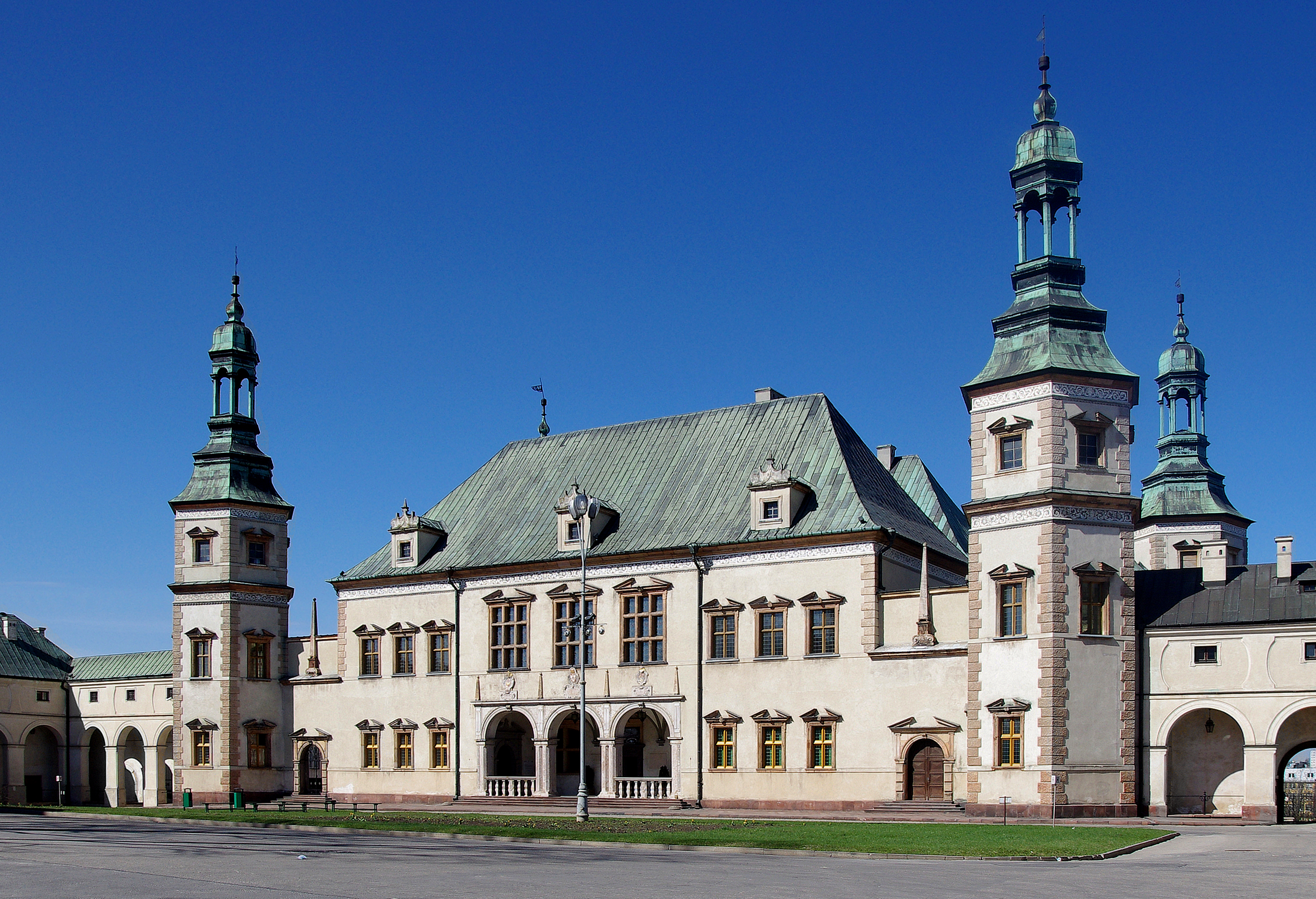
- Main façade as seen from the Kielce Cathedral (ancient Collegiate Church).
- Interactive map of the Palace of the Kraków Bishops; National Museum area

General information
- Architectural style: Mannerist-early Baroque
- Location: Kielce, Poland
- Coordinates: 50°52′09″N 20°37′39″E
- Construction started: 1637
- Completed: 1644
- Client: Jakub Zadzik

Design and construction
- Architect: Tommaso Poncino

The Palace of the Kraków Bishops in Kielce (Polish: Pałac Biskupów Krakowskich w Kielcach), was built in the 17th century as a summer residence of bishops of Kraków in Kielce, Poland. The architecture of the palace constitutes a unique mélange of Polish and Italian traditions and reflects political ambitions of its founder. Currently the palace houses a branch of the National Museum with an important gallery of Polish paintings.

== History ==
The residence of the Kraków (Cracow) bishops in the city of Kielce, was founded by bishop Jakub Zadzik, Great Crown Chancellor. The structure, erected between 1637 and 1644, was covered with a high-storey twin roofs and accomplished with towers on the corners.

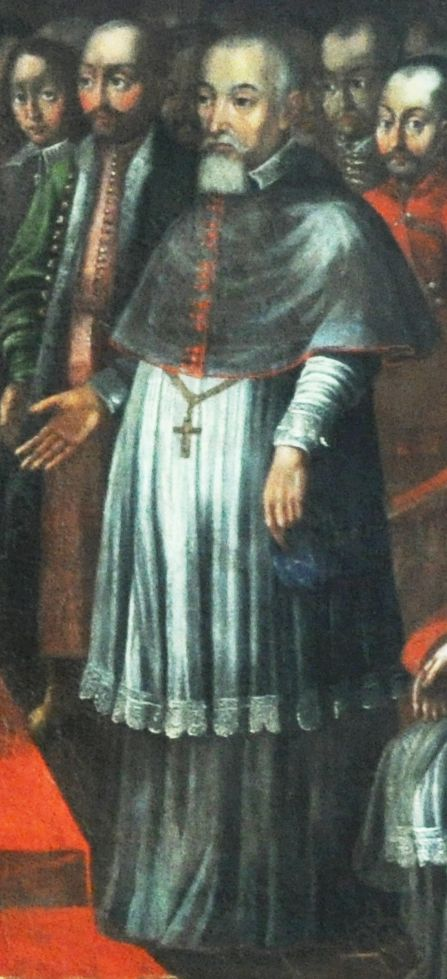
Palace founder Jakub Zadzik; detail of the ceiling fresco depicting the Judgment of the Arians

Its symmetrical, tripartite plan, loggias, towers and interior layout refers to the royal residences dating back the 1620s and 1630s, including Ujazdów Castle and the Villa Regia. The design of the palace is attributed to Tommaso Poncino of Lugano (ca. 1570–1659), author of numerous works of sacred and secular architecture in Kraków, Łowicz, Warsaw, Bright Mountain as well as in the Holy Cross region.

Initially, before the palace was a courtyard enclosed by walls with ceremonial gateway from the city, the rear garden, called Italian, an orchard, all surrounded by a wall with embrasures and 2 bastions. One of the bastions was later converted into a gunpowder tower. The whole complex including the Collegiate Church (now Kielce Cathedral), cour d'honneur, palace, garden and tower was aligned with a Bernardine Monastery on Karczówka hill (established 1624–1628).

The palace was expanded in the 18th century and converted into a French-style residence entre cour et jardin. One-storey wings were erected on both sides of the courtyard, one of them was connected by an indoor porch with the collegiate and a seminary of the Holy Trinity Church, funded by the bishop Konstanty Felicjan Szaniawski. The garden was embellished with French-style greenhouses, while large stables, coach houses, riding school, a granary and a brewery were erected in the palace complex.

After the nationalization of bishop's estates in 1789, the palace was the seat of various institutions – the Main Directorate of Mining (1816–1827) and the country's first technical university – Mining Academy and later the seat of the Kielce province authorities (1867–1914). During the Second Republic the 17th-century cupolas on the towers, removed in the 19th century, were restored. The interior space was reconstructed – the 18th-century ceilings were removed exposing beam ceilings and friezes. In the years 1919–1939 and 1945–1970 the palace housed the Provincial Office. The structure was converted into a museum in 1971.

== National Museum in Kielce ==
In 1971, by the resolution of the Provincial Branch of National Council, the palace complex with adjacent buildings was transferred to the Świętokrzyskie Museum, followed by the September 18, 1971, grand opening of the first two expositions: one on the ground floor, called the Nine Centuries of Kielce; and, on the second floor: the Gallery of Historic Interiors. In 1975, in recognition of its contribution to the development of culture, the facility was given the rank of the National Museum by the Minister of Culture and Art.

The permanent exhibits at the museum include Western European painting from 17th to 18th century, the Polish painting from 17th to 20th century, applied arts, archeology, Numismatics, armoury and others. Especially interesting are the works of Italian-born Johann Baptist von Lampi the Elder (Giambattista Lampi, known as Jan Chrzciciel Lampi in Polish), Leopold Gottlieb, Olga Boznańska, Józef Chełmoński, Aleksander Gierymski, Jacek Malczewski and Stanisław Wyspiański among others.

== Palace complex ==
=== Exterior of the Bishops' Palace ===
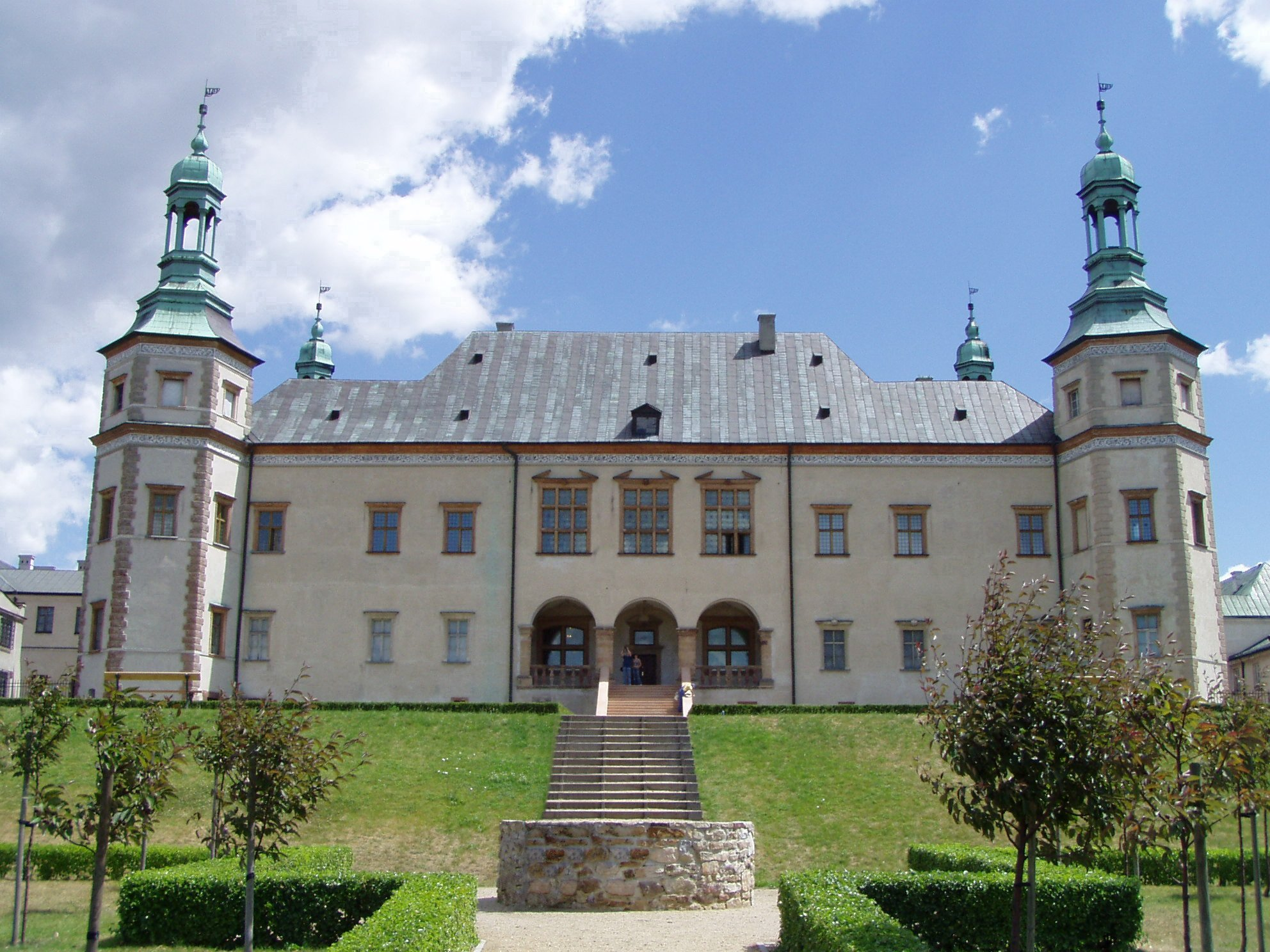
Garden façade of the palace.

The point of reference for the early-17th-century bishops' residencies in Poland were royal palaces. Ujazdów Castle constructed for king Sigismund III Vasa in 1624, was an inspiration for the palace in Kielce, whereas the Kielce palace was imitated by many magnate families in their residencies (e.g. Tarło Palace in Podzamcze, 1645–1650 and Radziwiłł Palace in Biała Podlaska). This type of palace was known as Poggio–Reale because it combined a square building with a central loggia, with side towers as in Villa Poggio Reale near Naples (1487–1489) according to conception of Baldassare Peruzzi and Sebastiano Serlio. The palace in Kielce was built in accordance with "the principles of Italian symmetry" wrote Szymon Starowolski in his 1652 book Poland published in Gdańsk. Steep roofs, towers and decorations are Dutch style features.

The main accent of the flat facade of the palace is the central loggia adorned with pillars of black marble, which correspond to the first floor windows of the great hall. The loggia arcades were crowned with stone cartouches with coats of arms of bishop Zadzik (Korab), Polish–Lithuanian Commonwealth (White Eagle and Pahonia with Vasa crest) and Cracow chapter (Aaron – Three Crowns), and obelisks. The sides of the rectangular structure were finished with hexagonal towers covered with openwork helmets and connected with the main building by walls topped obelisks, with gates leading to the smaller courtyards. Formerly the walls were also adorned with statues of the Swedish and Muscovy ambassadors. The space under the cornices is decorated with a sgraffito frieze.

=== Interior space ===
The nature of the interior of the palace is based on its original function. The ground floor was occupied by officials of the episcopal court, guards and servants. The main entrance through the arcade loggia lead to the vast hall (now divided), from where the vaulted corridors lead to the side courtyards. The left side of the palace was occupied by podskarbi (treasurer), treasury, lockers and storage facilities, while the right was reserved for the marshal and starosta (mayor). The chambers were covered with a simple beam ceilings, part of the treasury was vaulted. The vaults in the loggias and in the north-west alcove were adorned with stucco decorations.

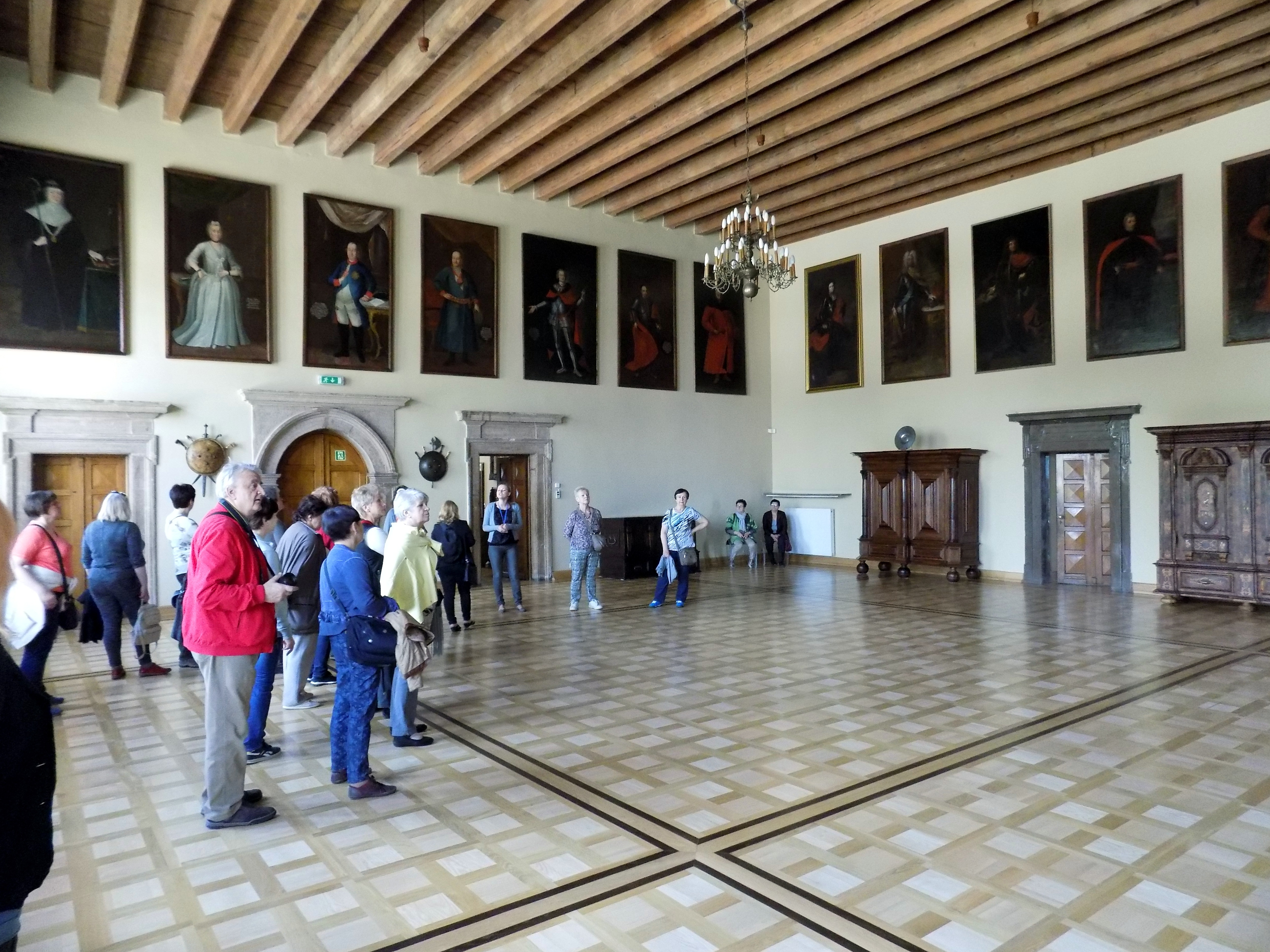
Interior of the palace

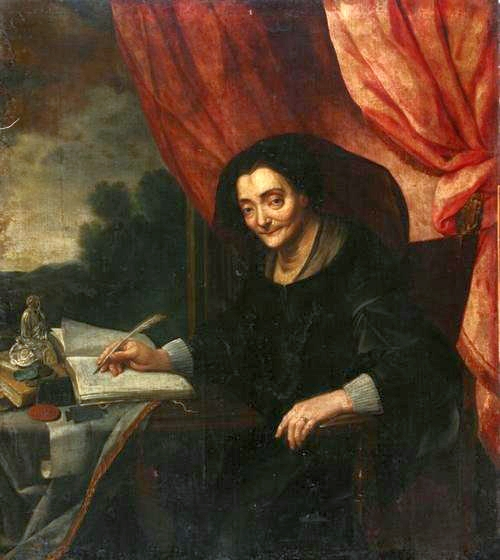
Portrait of Felice Zacchia Rondinini, daughter of Cardinal Laudivio Zacchia and renowned art collector, is one of the most valuable paintings in the palace's collection.

The ceremonial staircase lead from the front loggia on the piano nobile (first floor). Tripartite arrangement of the rooms is determined by the great hall at the front, the dining room at the back and residential apartments on the sides. The great hall was sided from the south with a chapel built to the design of Sebastiano Sala, treasury and so-called stove depths, on the other side there were rooms for the clergy. The upper dining room is one of the most impressive of the palace's interiors covering approximately 200 m^{2} (240 sq yd) and a height of 6.8 m (7.4 yd). The ceiling is composed of 21 larch beams and 1017 boards covered with polychrome depicting 40 allegorical scenes (continents, seasons, months) symbolic (skull, hourglass, monkey, deer), landscape scenes and geometric-floral decoration.

The upper parts of the walls are covered with a painted frieze, while the spaces between the windows are filled with 17th-century portraits of the Cracow bishops – Jakub Zadzik and his successor Piotr Gembicki, kings Sigismund III and Władysław IV and coat of arms (same as on the facade). The other walls were covered with a painted effigies of the Cracow bishops – 35 busts of bishops from Paweł of Przemanków (1266–1292) to John Albert Vasa (1632–1634) dating back from the first half of the 17th century. The lower row of 16 portraits from Jakub Zadzik to Karol Skórkowski (1830–1851) was painted by Aleksander Rycerski, who in the years 1861–1863 carried out a refurbishment of the upper frieze. The dining room lead to the most distinguished suites – the "Bishops apartment" on the left and the "Senator apartment" on the right. The rooms were adorned with carved, gilded frame ceilings filled with oil paintings, created in Kraków workshop of Tommaso Dolabella, an Italian painter active in Poland since 1598, who participated in the decoration of the Palazzo Ducale in Venice.

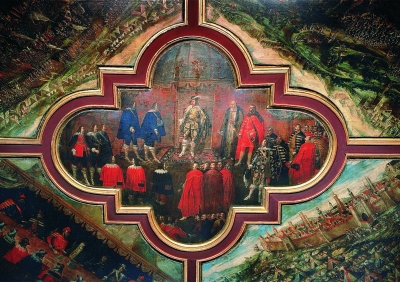
Treaty of Stuhmsdorf, the central painting of a plafond, visible: bishop Jakub Zadzik, king Władysław IV Vasa and hetman Stanisław Koniecpolski.

The bishops apartment consisted of two antechambers, bedroom-study and a study. The antechamber adjacent to the dining room area was once decorated with a plafond depicting the scene of the 1634 treaty ending the Polish-Muscovite War (Treaty of Stuhmsdorf), while its walls were covered with a gilded cordovan. Among the elements of the original furnishing the most important are black marble fireplace topped with the Korab coat of arms and the remnants of marble floor. The framework Venetian ceilings, patterned after such in the Palazzo Ducale, appeared in Poland in the early 17th century initially in the interiors of royal residences (Wawel Castle). Such decoration soon become the main feature of the representative chambers of the noble residences, town halls and even merchant houses. Among a dozen ceilings documented in sources only two preserved – in Gdańsk and Kielce.

The ceiling in the antechamber located next to the bedroom-study is adorned with the Bishop Zadzik family crests (Korab, Jelita, Dołęga, Rola), the central painting of the plafond depicts the parliamentary scene The Judgment of the Arians in 1638 with portraits of king Władysław IV, bishop Zadzik, other dignitaries and a group of dissenters. The background scene is a vast landscape of a town with a church (Raków?) and the departure of the Arians (Polish Brethren), members of the Polish Protestant church, who taught the equality and brotherhood of all people. In the corners are visible personifications of the seasons. Just like in the next room, the walls were covered with a green-golden fabric, the marble portal and floor were recreated.

== Garden ==
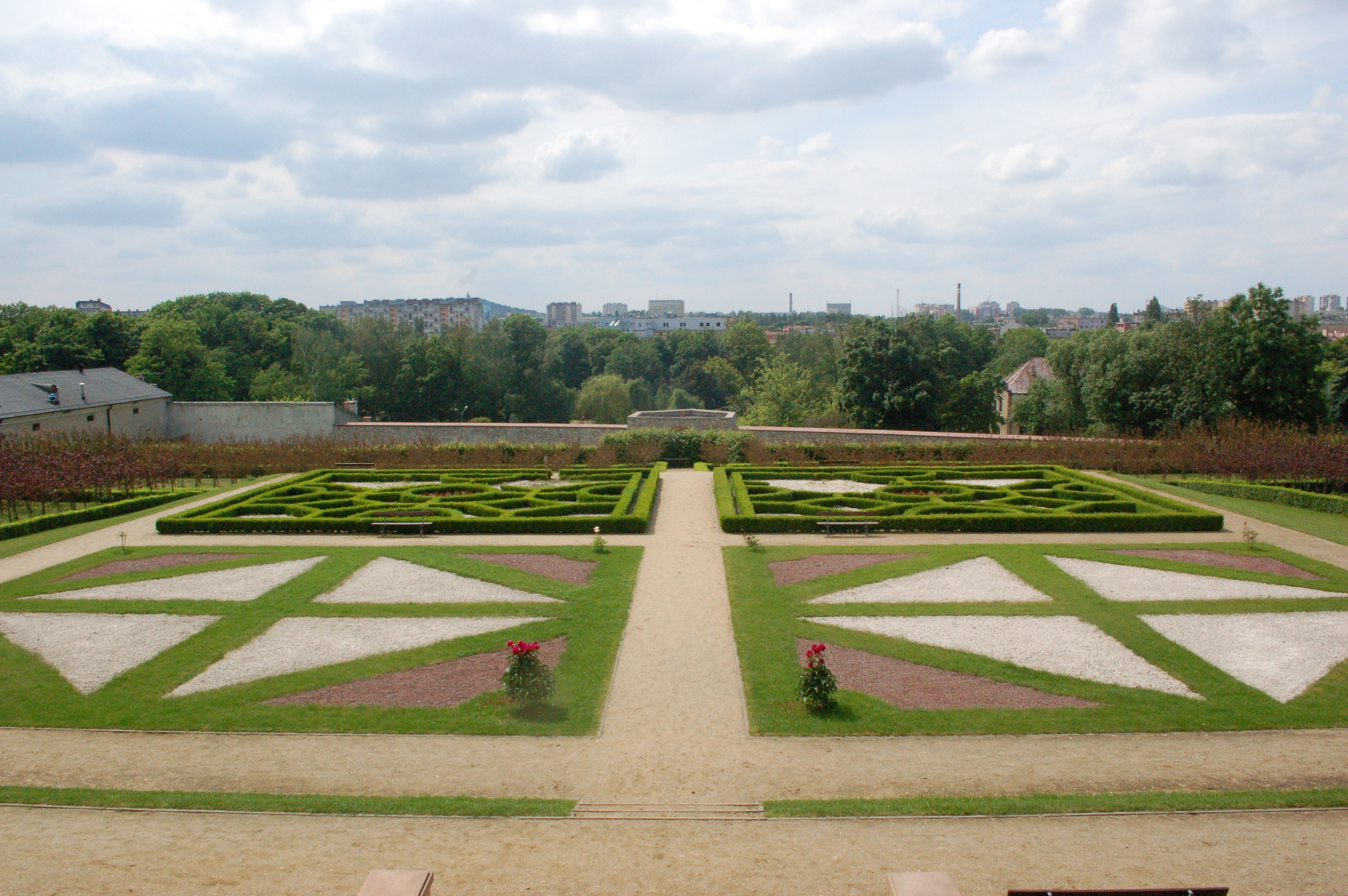
Terraced Italian garden.

Since the beginning the palace accompanied by a small decorative garden, called Italian, referring to the castle gardens created within the walls. The axis of the garden was the extension of the palace's axis, leading from the loggia into a well, roofed by a green dome, and the gunpowder tower. The central terrace with herbs and seasonal flowers was surrounded by fruit trees, forming a court orchard. The apartment directly adjacent to the western facade of the palace formed an integral part of the formal apartment, it was accompanied with so-called giardino segretto (secret garden), a place only for the owner.

In the following centuries the mannerist garden arrangement was maintained. The symmetrical geometric parterres were enriched with rows of hornbeam with linden gazebos and dwarf fruit trees were planted (quince, cherries, apples). There were also buildings: orangery, fighouse, two greenhouses, ice house and cold frames for the cultivation of seedling plants.

In 1789, after the taking over of the bishops estates by the civil authorities, part of the garden plots was allocated to the officials, the staircase leading from the palace to the garden was rebuilt and the original layout of the garden was obliterated. The 17th-century geometrical garden with a central portion surrounded by an apple orchard, was restored in 2003.

== Other structures ==
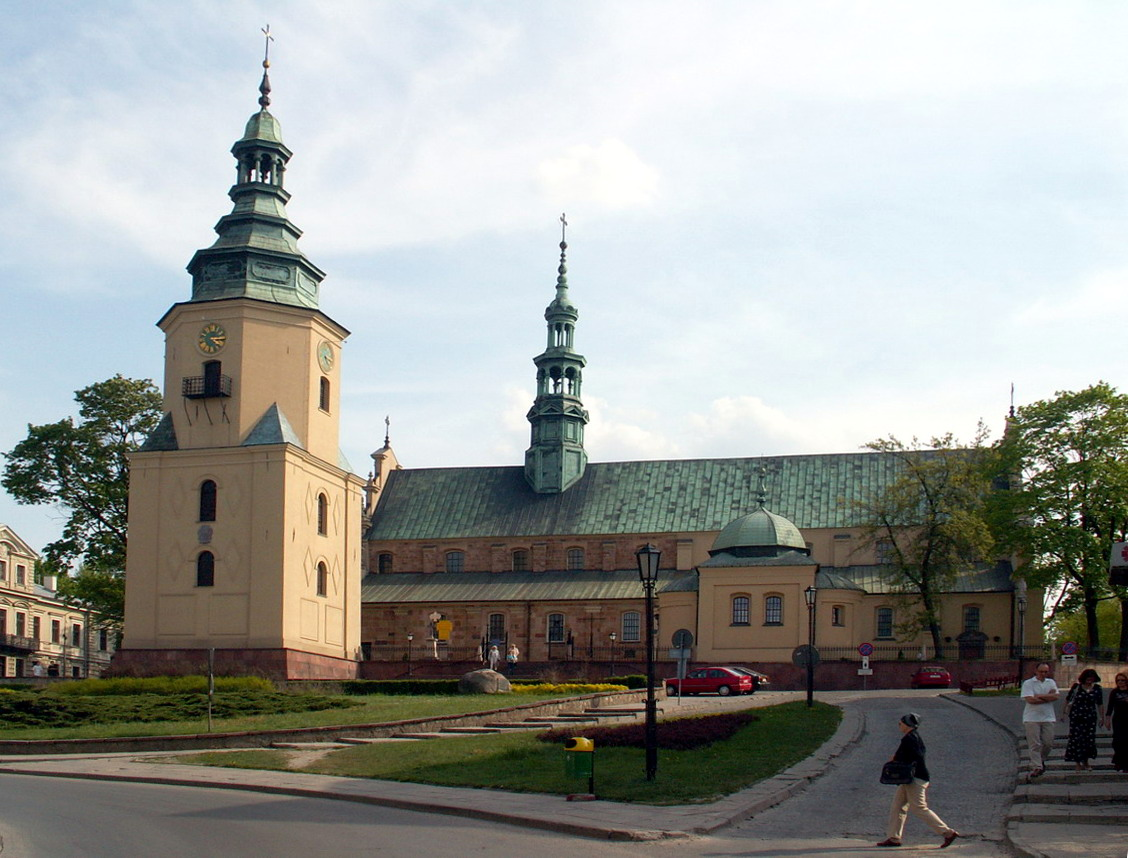
Collegiate Church, rebuilt 1632–1635.

The original 17th–18th-century palace complex includes also the Collegiate Church, the Holy Trinity Church and a seminary. The Collegiate Church was established in 1171 by bishop Gideon (Gedko) together with the collegiate's chapter and a parish. The original hewn stone church was built in the Romanesque style. The church was enlarged in the 16th, in the first half of the 17th century (1632–1635) and after 1719 forming a three-nave basilica and consecrated in 1728 by Konstanty Felicjan Szaniawski

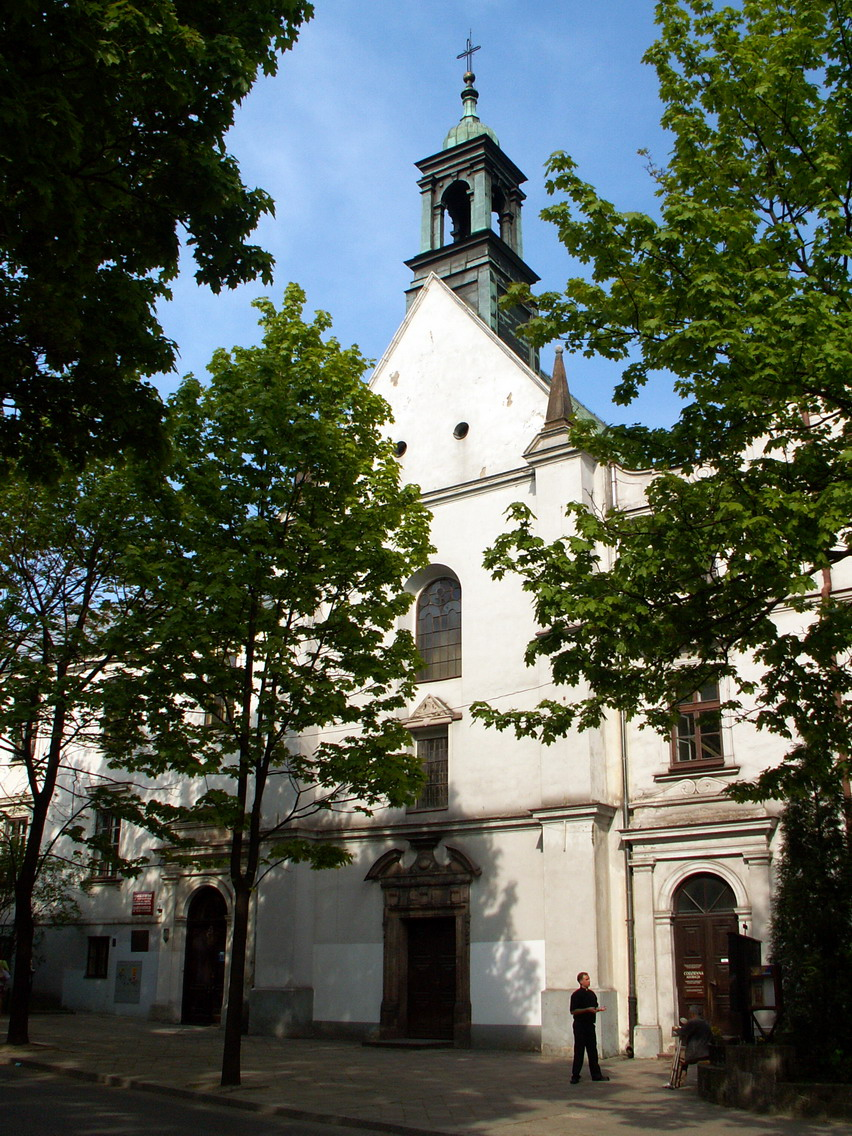
Holy Trinity Church, built 1640–1644.

The Baroque main altar, made by Antoni Frączkiewicz, was decorated with a painting of the Assumption, painted in Rome in 1730 by Szymon Czechowicz. The interior has many monuments, including one of the most important monuments of the Renaissance art in Poland – the tomb of Elżbieta of Krzycki Zebrzydowska, mother of bishop Andrzej Zebrzydowski.

The first mention of the Holy Trinity Church dates from 1602. In 1638 bishop Jakub Zadzik established the hospital rectory church of the Holy Trinity. Soon afterwards a stone church was built accompanied by a timber building of a hospital. The construction was completed in 1644, and the Chapel of the Assumption of the Blessed Virgin Mary sponsored by the starosta of Kielce – Stanisław Czechowski was erected. The new church was consecrated two years later, on April 6, 1646, by bishop Piotr Gembicki. In 1725 bishop Konstanty Felicjan Szaniawski founded the present high altar, side altars, pews and a pulpit. He has also started the construction of the sacristy and established a seminary in 1726.

== Influences ==
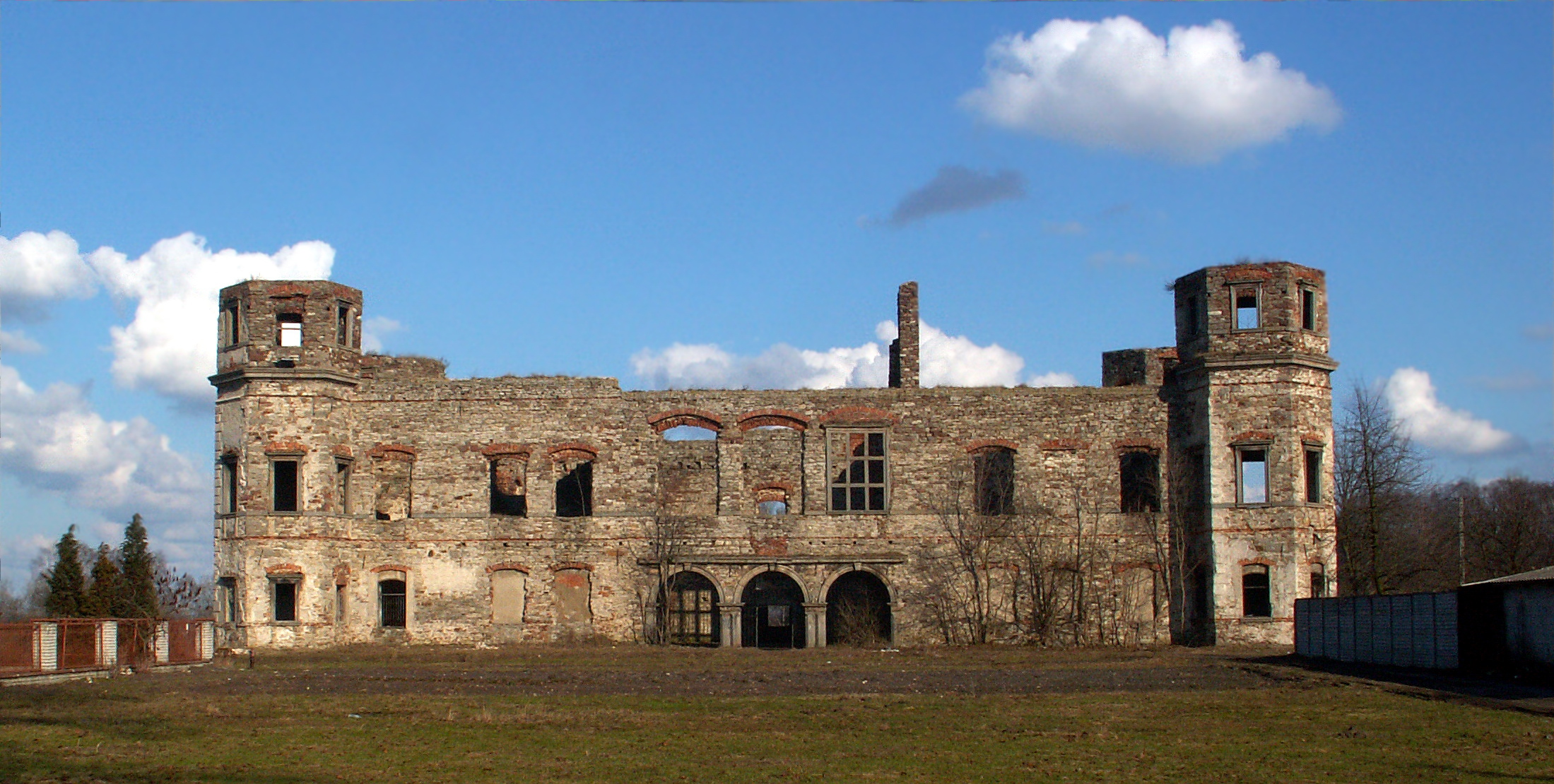
Tarło Palace in Podzamcze Piekoszowskie.

The structure had a large influence on contemporary architecture immediately after its completion. The founder of one of the most significant imitation in Podzamcze Piekoszowskie was Jan Aleksander Tarło, voivode of Sandomierz. The palace was built between 1645 and 1650, and its construction had cost the equivalent of 30 villages. The property was owned by the Tarło family until 1842, and changed its owners several times in the following years. After a fire in the mid-19th century the palace turned into a ruin. Legend has it that during the banquet furnished by bishop Jakub Zadzik in his newly built palace in Kielce, the host rejected the invitation of Jan Aleksander Tarło, saying "I'm not staying in huts" and offended Tarło said – "I invite Your Excellency to Piekoszów for two years, to the same palace as Your Excellency have here".

== See also ==
- List of mannerist structures in Southern Poland
- List of palaces in Poland

== Notes and references ==
=== Bibliography ===
1. Fedorowicz, J.K.; Bogucka, Maria; Samsonowicz, Henryk (1982), A Republic of nobles: studies in Polish history to 1864, CUP Archive, ISBN 0-521-24093-X.
2. Karpowicz, Mariusz (2002), Tomasz Poncino (ok. 1590-1659): architekt pałacu Kieleckiego (Tommaso Poncino (ca. 1590-1659): architect of the Kielce palace) (in Polish), National Museum in Kielce, ISBN 83-909744-7-9.
