= Adam Tarło =

Polish nobleman (1713–1744)

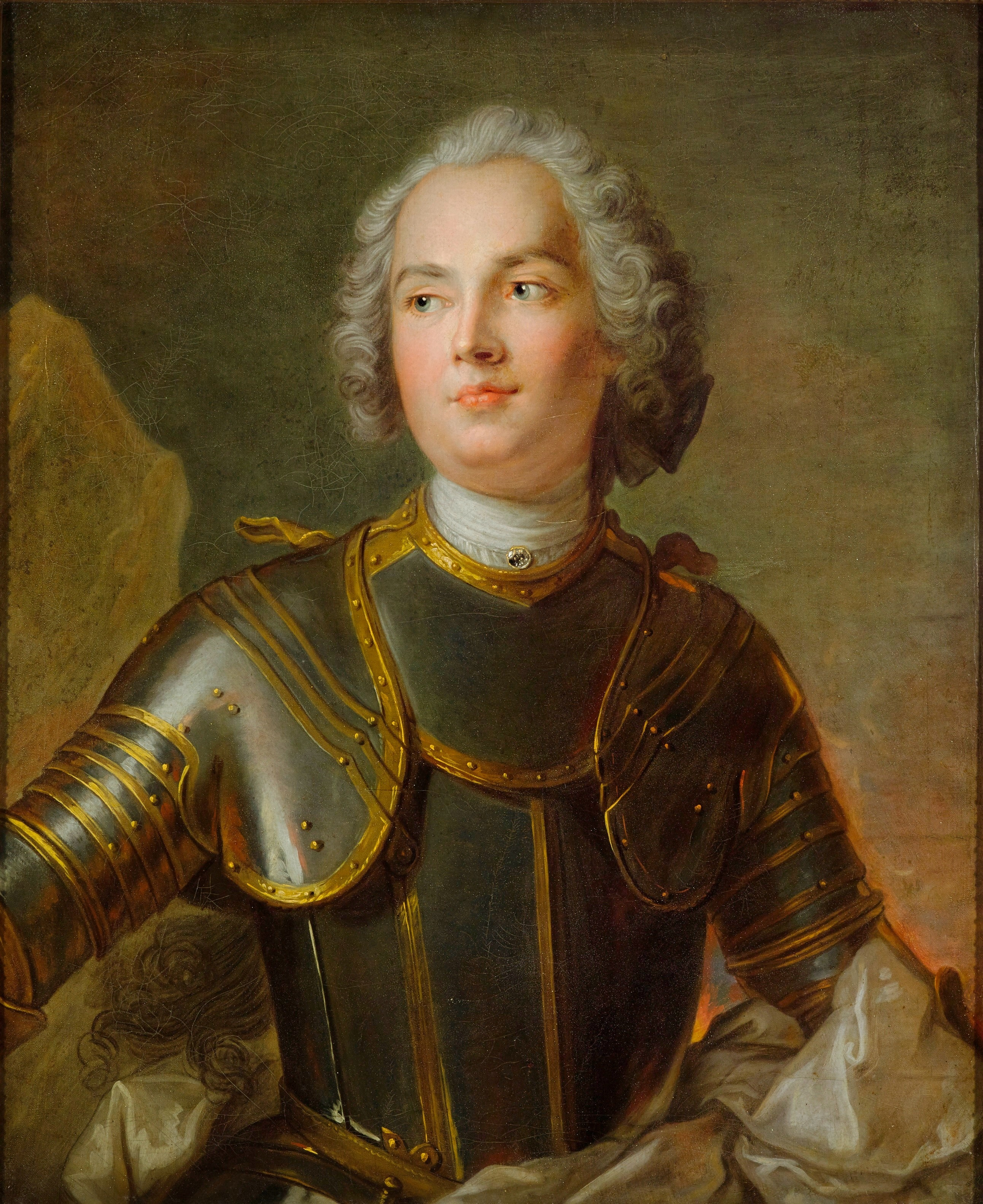
- Portrait by Jean-Marc Nattier, c. 1740
- Coat of arms: Topór
- Born: 1713
- Died: 1744 (aged 30–31)
- Family: Tarło

Adam Tarło (1713–1744) was a Polish nobleman (szlachcic).

He was voivode of Lublin Voivodeship since 1736 and starost of Jasło He was a cousin of Queen Marie Leszczyńska of France, wife of Louis XV.

During the War of Polish Succession (1734–1738) he supported Stanisław I Leszczyński and was commander of partisans of the short-lived Dzików Confederation. He was killed by Count Kazimierz Poniatowski in a duel in 1744.

== See also ==
- Lublin Voivode
