= Jan Tarło (1527–1587) =

Polish noble

- Coat of arms: Topór
- Born: c. 1527
- Died: 1587
- Family: Tarło
- Consort: Dorota Gostomska; Agnieszka Szafraniec
- Issue: with Dorota Gostomska; Anna Tarło with Agnieszka Szafraniec; Piotr Aleksander Tarło; Jan Amor Tarło; Jadwiga Tarło; Helena Tarło
- Father: Jan Tarło
- Mother: Dorota Tarnowska

Jan Tarło (c. 1527 – 1587) was a Polish nobleman (szlachcic).

Jan was wojski of Lwów from 1555 to 1554, courtier on the royal court since 1554, secretary of the king since 1556, castellan of Małogoszcz since 1563 and of Radom since 1565, voivode of Lublin Voivodeship since 1574, and starost of Łomża and Pilzno.
