= Jan Karol Tarło =

Polish–Lithuanian noble (c. 1593 – c. 1645)

- Coat of arms: Topór
- Born: c. 1593
- Died: c. 1645
- Family: Tarło
- Consort: Marianna Ligęza
- Issue: Teresa Tarło; Barbara Tarło
- Father: Stanisław Tarło
- Mother: Barbara Dulska

Jan Karol Tarło (c. 1593 – c. 1645) was a Polish–Lithuanian noble (szlachcic).

He was the son of starost Stanisław Tarło and Barbara Dulska. He married Marianna Ligęza around 1636.

He was castellan of Wiślice and starost of Olsztyn and Zwoleń.

His daughter Barbara married Jerzy Sebastian Lubomirski, a powerful magnate and hetman.

== Bibliography ==
- Tchórzewska-Kabata, Halina (2010). Pod znakiem światła: Biblioteka Ordynacji Krasińskich: 1844-1944 (in Polish). Biblioteka Narodowa. ISBN 9788370097776.
- Zurek, Werner (2021). The Noble Polish Family Baran (Aries) Die Adlige Polnische Familie Baran (Widder). Books on Demand. ISBN 9783753435183.
- Polskie Towarzystwo Heraldyczne (2001) [1910]. Rocznik Polskiego Towarzystwa Heraldycznego [Yearbook of the Polish Heraldry Society] (in Polish and Latin). Vol. 5–7. Nakł. Polskiego Towarzystwa Heraldycznego.
