= Zygmunt Tarło =

Polish nobleman (c. 1561 – 1628)

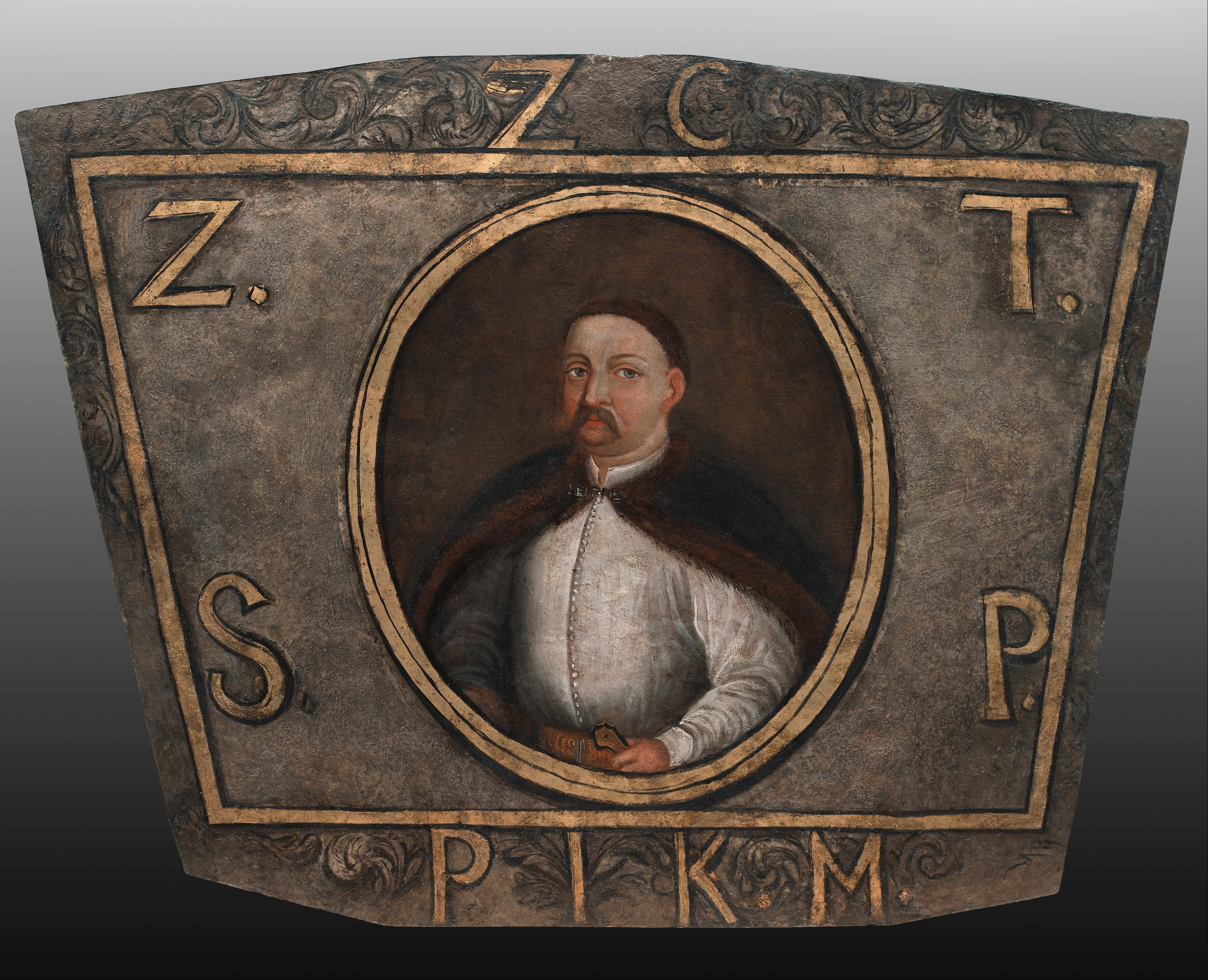
- Coat of arms: Topór
- Born: c. 1561
- Died: 7 September 1628
- Buried: Żarki
- Noble family: Tarło
- Consort: Barbara Drohojewska
- Father: Jan Tarło
- Mother: Regina z Malczyc

Zygmunt Tarło (c. 1561 or 1562 – 7 September 1628) was a Polish nobleman of the Tarło family, bearing the Topór coat of arms. He served as Chorąży of Przemyśl from 1606 and as castellan of Nowy Sącz from 1613.

During his tenure as castellan, Tarło became a patron of the Catholic Church. In 1621 he was the first to propose establishing a monastery for the Franciscan Reformati in the Polish–Lithuanian Commonwealth, at Zakliczyn on the Dunajec; the friars arrived there on 19 June 1622, making it the first Reformati house in the Commonwealth.

== Family ==
He married Barbara Drohojewska in 1601. Contemporary and later genealogical sources identify their children as Zygmunt Aleksander Tarło, Andrzej Tarło, and Teofilia Tarło. He was buried in Żarki.
