= Andrzej Tarło =

Polish noble (died c. 1531)

- Coat of arms: Topór
- Born: 15th century
- Died: c. 1531
- Family: Tarło
- Spouse: Katarzyna Michowska
- Issue: with Katarzyna Michowska; Paweł Tarło; Jan Tarło; Mikołaj Tarło; Andrzej Tarło; Dorota Tarło; Katarzyna Tarło
- Father: Andrzej Tarło
- Mother: Barbara Herburt

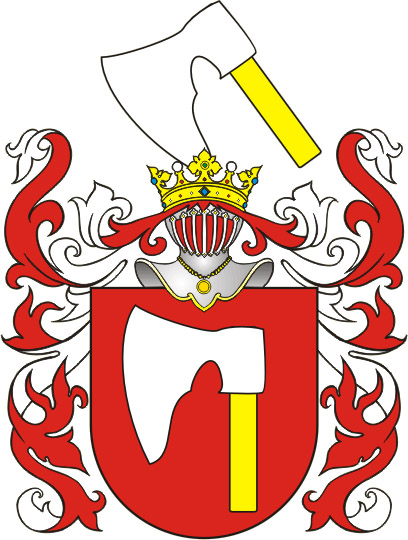
The topór (axe) coat of arms, used by Tarło.

Andrzej Tarło (died c. 1531) was a Polish noble. He was chorąży of Lwów. In 1524, he married Katarzyna Michowska.

He was the son of Barbara Herbutów and Andrzej Tarło. He also founded an Orthodox parish in Laszki.
