= Jan Tarło (d. 1550) =

Polish nobleman

- Coat of arms: Topór
- Born: 15th century
- Died: 1550
- Family: Tarło
- Consort: Dorota Tarnowska
- Issue: Jan Tarło; Mikołaj Tarło; Anna Tarło; Elżbieta Tarło
- Father: Stanisław Tarło
- Mother: Małgorzata Magier

Jan Tarło (died 1550) was a Polish nobleman.

Jan was a Crown Craver since 1522, Crown Vice-cupbearer since 1546, Crown Cupbearer since 1550 and Starost of Pilzno.
