= Podzamcze, Kielce County =

Podzamcze
- Village
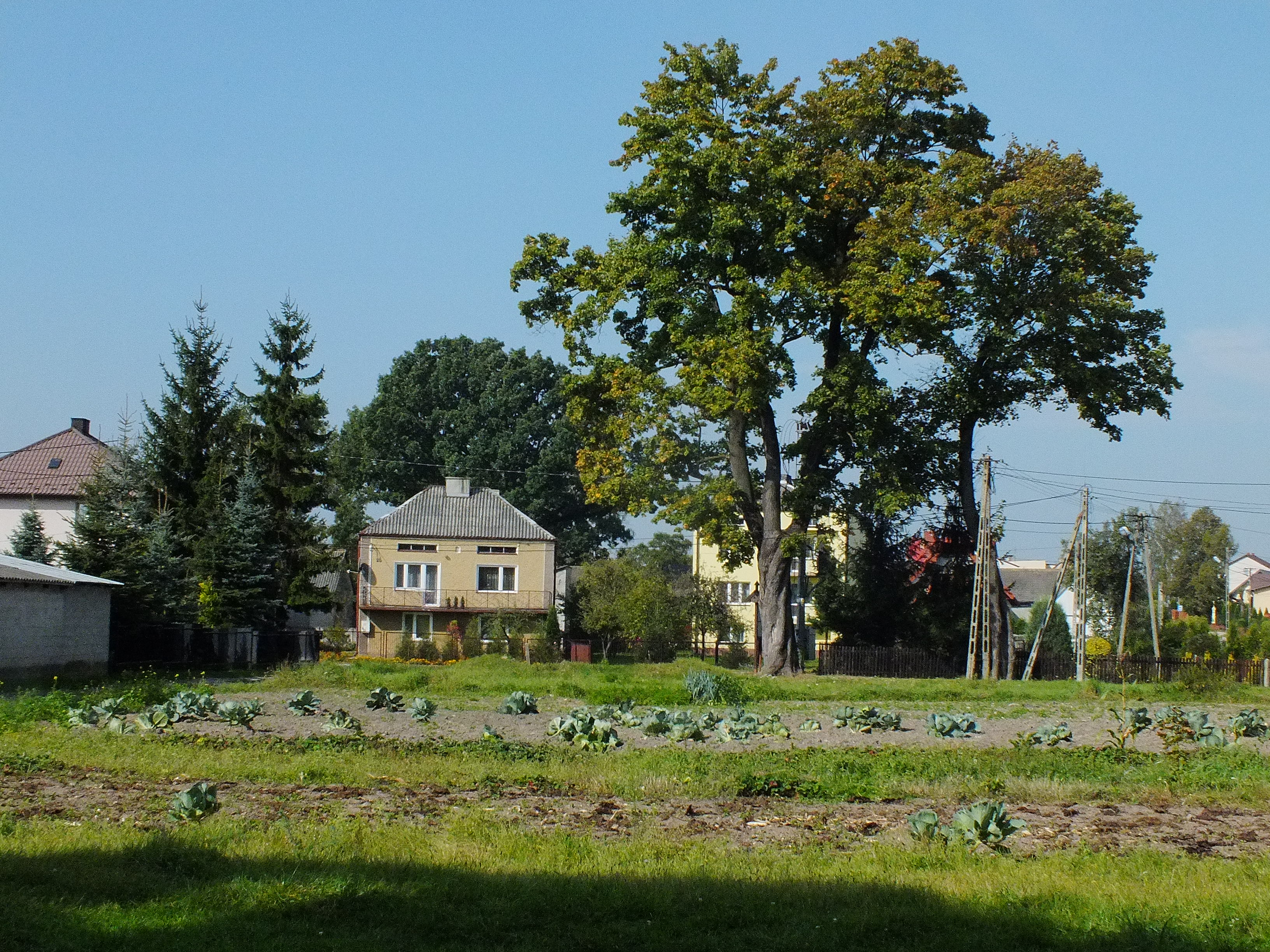

- Location within Poland
- Coordinates: 50°53′31″N 20°29′17″E
- Country: Poland
- Voivodeship: Świętokrzyskie
- County: Kielce
- Gmina: Piekoszów
- Population: 340

Podzamcze [pɔˈd͡zamt͡ʂɛ] is a village in the administrative district of Gmina Piekoszów, within Kielce County, Świętokrzyskie Voivodeship, in south-central Poland. It lies approximately 3 km (2 mi) north-east of Piekoszów and 10 km (6 mi) west of the regional capital Kielce.

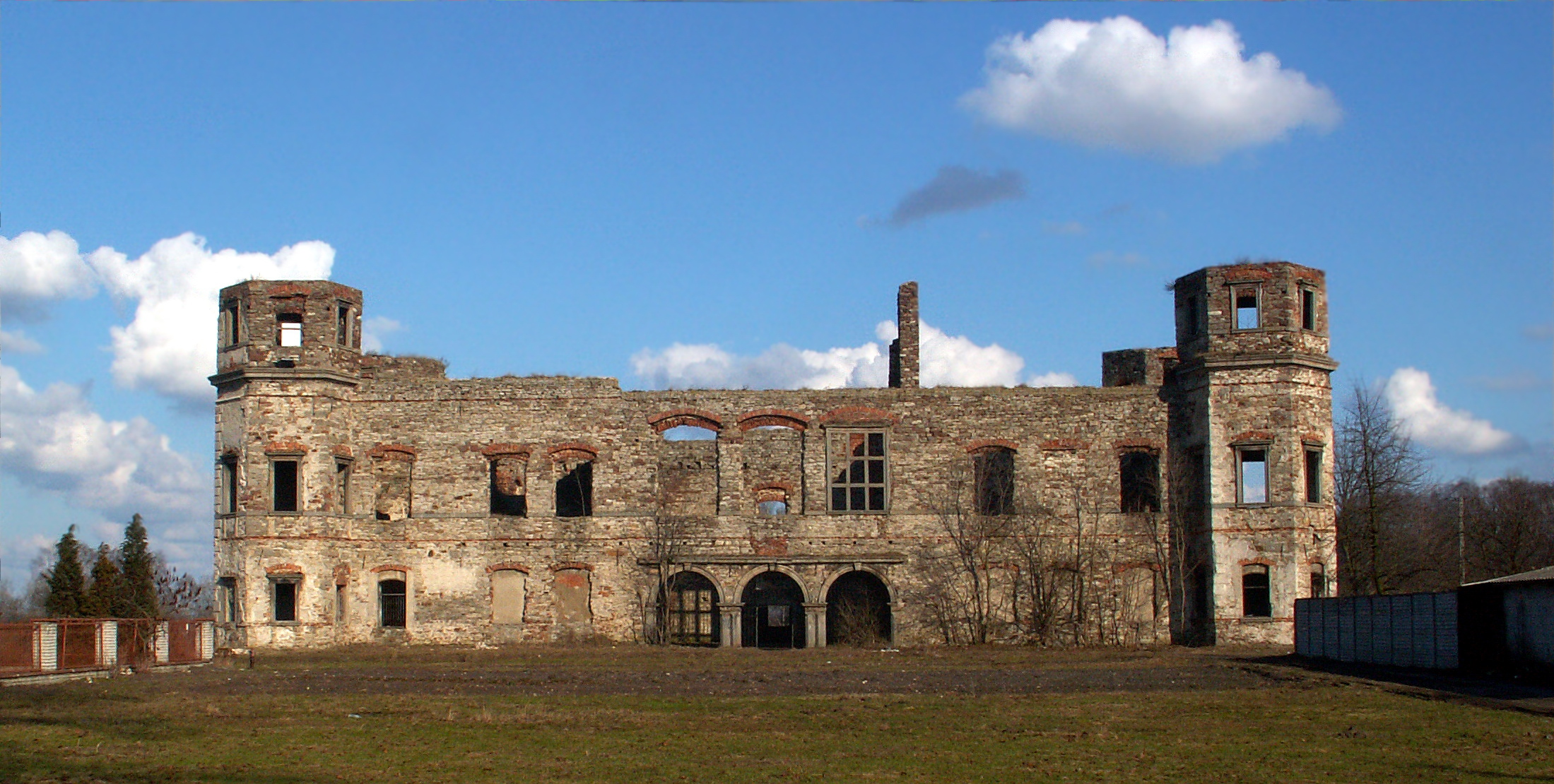
Palace ruins

There are ruins of a palace of Tarło noble family, built in 1645–1650, modelled after the Cracow Bishops' Palace in Kielce. It burnt in the 19th century.
