= Paweł Tarło =

Polish noble and archbishop (died 1565)

- Coat of arms: Topór
- Born: 16th century
- Died: 1565
- Noble family: Tarło
- Father: Andrzej Tarło
- Mother: Katarzyna Michowska

Paweł Tarło (died 1565) was a Polish noble.

Tarło was canon of Kraków, dean of Przemyśl and Archbishop of Lwów from 1561 (then in the Kingdom of Poland, now Lviv in Ukraine).

Preceded by Feliks Ligęza	Archbishop of Lwów; 1561–1565	Succeeded by Stanisław Słomowski
