= Zwoleń =

Town in Masovian Voivodeship, Poland

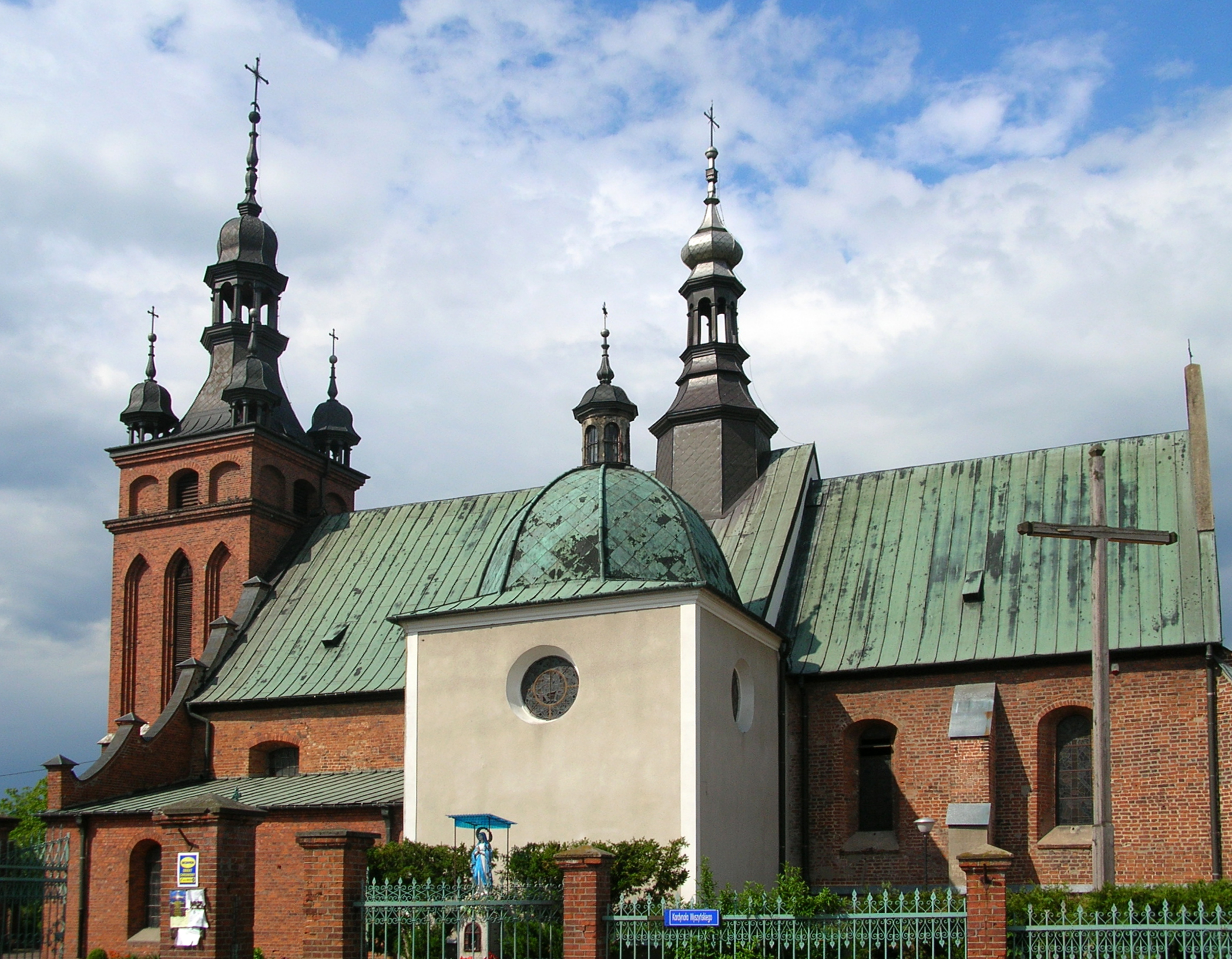
- 15th-century church in Zwoleń

- Coat of arms

- Location within Poland
- Coordinates: 51°21′25″N 21°35′2″E
- Country: Poland
- Voivodeship: Masovian
- County: Zwoleń
- Gmina: Zwoleń
- Established: 1425
- Town rights: 1425

Government
  - Mayor: Arkadiusz Sulima

Area
  - Total: 15.78 km^{2} (6.09 sq mi)

Population (2006)
  - Total: 8,176
  - Density: 518.1/km^{2} (1,342/sq mi)
- Time zone: UTC+1 (CET)
  - Summer (DST): UTC+2 (CEST)
- Postal code: 26-700
- Area code: +48 48
- Car plates: WZW
- Primary airport: Radom Airport
- Website: http://www.zwolen.pl

Zwoleń [ˈzvɔlɛɲ] (Yiddish: זוואלין Zvolin) is a town in eastern Poland, in Masovian Voivodeship, about 30 kilometres (19 miles) east of Radom. It is the capital of Zwoleń County. Population is 8,048 (2009). Zwoleń belongs to Sandomierz Land of the historic province of Lesser Poland, and is located on the Zwoleńka river.

== History ==
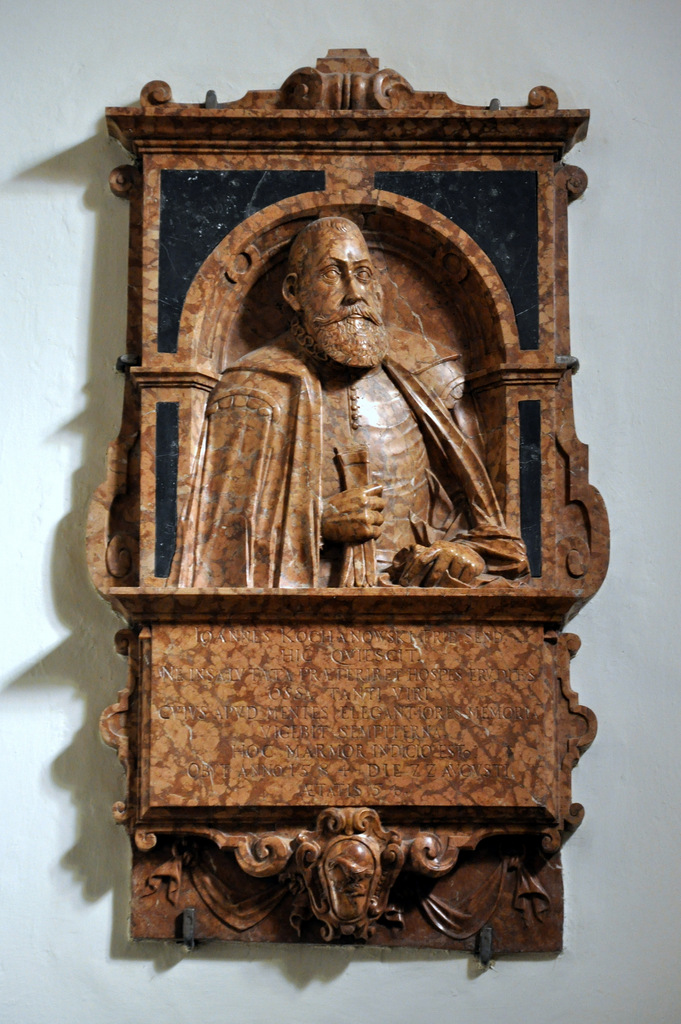
Renaissance epitaph of poet Jan Kochanowski in Holy Cross Church

The history of the town dates back to the early 15th century, when Zwoleń was founded on a privilege issued by King Władysław II Jagiełło. The first wójt was Jan Cielątko. Zwoleń was a royal town of Poland, administratively located in the Radom County in the Sandomierz Voivodeship in the Lesser Poland Province. In the 16th century, it already was a center of local trade, located along the road from Lublin to Radom and Greater Poland. In 1566–1575, Polish Renaissance poet and writer Jan Kochanowski worked at a local Roman Catholic parish. Kochanowski, who died in Lublin, was buried in the local Holy Cross church.

During the Swedish invasion known as the Deluge (1655-1660), Zwoleń was destroyed to such a degree that it never recovered its regional significance. In late 18th century, during Partitions of Poland, Zwoleń was annexed by the Austrian Empire. Between 1807 and 1815, it was part of the French-controlled Polish Duchy of Warsaw, established by Napoleon. In 1815 it became part of Congress Poland, a protectorate of the Russian Empire. After the January Uprising, in 1869, Russian authorities deprived Zwoleń of its town rights, as a punishment for residents' support of the insurgents. The village of Zwoleń stagnated for years, and did not regain its town rights until 1925, after Poland regained sovereignty in 1918. In 1921 Zwoleń had 8,544 residents, of which 3,787 were Jews.

=== World War II ===
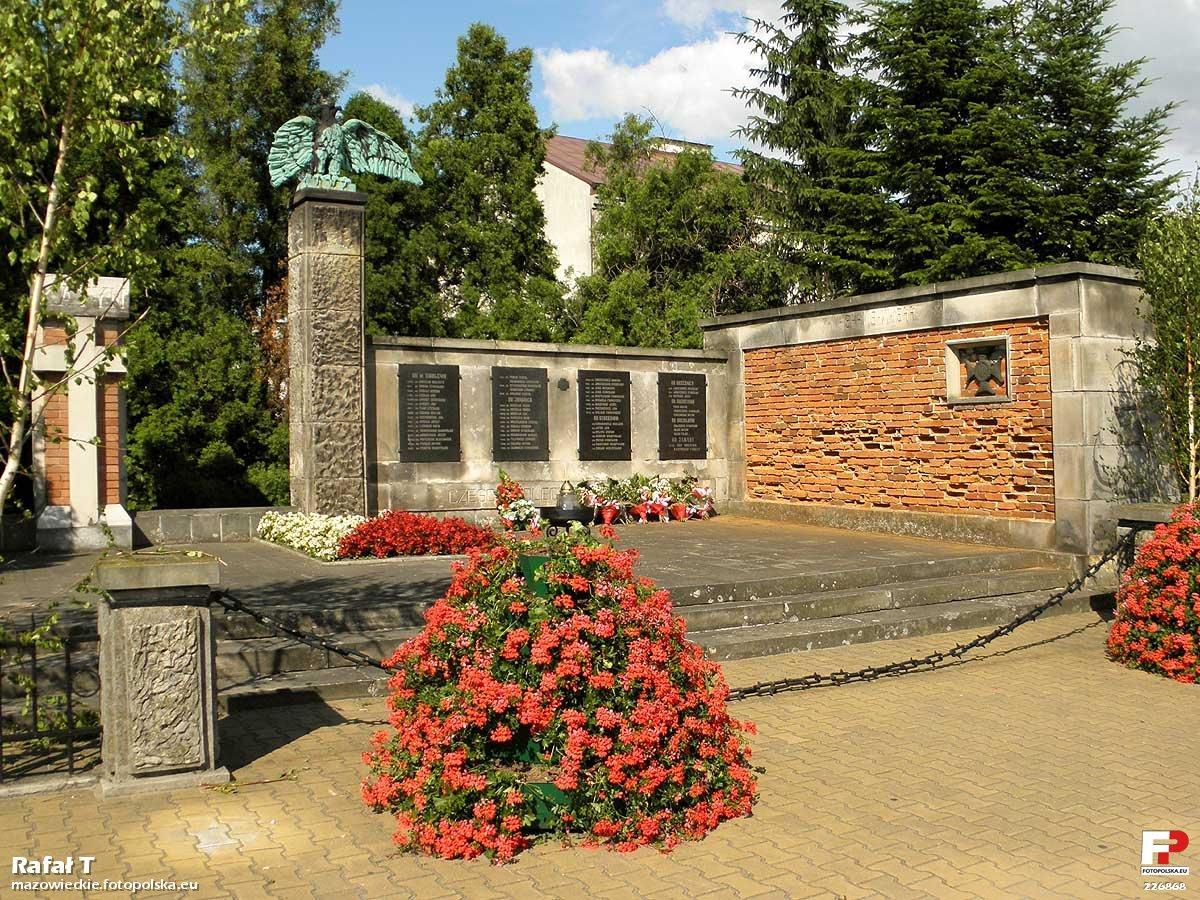
Memorial to Poles murdered by the Germans in mass executions in April 1944

The Nazi German invasion of Poland in 1939 was a disastrous period for the town. Almost 80% of buildings were destroyed in air attacks and artillery bombardments. Houses around the market square and the local synagogue were burned. German occupiers carried out numerous mass executions of underground resistance fighters (from Home Army to Bataliony Chłopskie). At the beginning of 1941, the Nazi German administration established a ghetto in the southern part of Zwoleń for local Jews as well as all transports from neighbouring villages. In March 1941, Jews from Przytyk were transferred to Zwoleń (fact disputed by some scholars claiming that by then Jews of Przytyk were already removed). On December 22, 1941 the Jüdischer Wohnbezirk was formally registered. By April 1942, the unfenced, open ghetto had some 4,500 inhabitants living in 239 houses (7 per room on average). Hundreds were homeless. On August 19–20, 1942 approximately 5,000 Jews were shipped in from Gniewoszów ghetto nearby. The Germans also brought to the ghetto Jews from other locations (Janowice, Pionki, Jedlnia, Garbatka), further increasing their numbers. It is estimated that prior to mass deportations there were 6,500–10,000 Jews living there (top estimate by historian Adam Rutkowski has also been disputed). The Zwoleń ghetto was liquidated on 29 September 1942. All inmates (about 8,000 according to Daniel Blatman) were made to walk 15 kilometres (9 miles) to the railway station in Garbatka. A few hundred prisoners unable to walk were shot along the way. From there, all Jews were transported in freight trains to Treblinka extermination camp where they were immediately gassed. Around 70 Jewish Holocaust survivors returned to Zwoleń after the war but soon moved on because of the hostility in post-war Poland.

On April 7 and 19, 1944, the Germans carried out mass public executions of Poles. Nevertheless, the Polish resistance movement was active in the town.

=== Postwar development ===
In 1954, a new Zwoleń County of Kielce Voivodeship was created, which was a great boost to the town economy. Factories and new schools were opened including a meat plant and a branch of Radom's Łucznik Arms Factory. In 1975, after administrative reform of the communist Poland, all counties were abolished and Zwoleń became part of Radom Voivodeship. It regained its county capital status in 1999.

A Yizkor book about Jewish life in Zwoleń was published in 1982 in New York in Yiddish. The book is available for purchase and for free online. It has been translated to English and is available online on JewishGen.

== Transport ==
The town is located in southeastern corner of Mazovian Voivodeship, at the crossroads of two national roads: the 79th (Warsaw - Sandomierz - Kraków - Bytom), and the 12th (Łęknica - Dorohusk). Zwoleń does not have a rail station, but maintains bus connections with several towns and cities. The nearest airport is the Radom Airport, located about 40 km (25 mi) west of the town.

== Culture ==
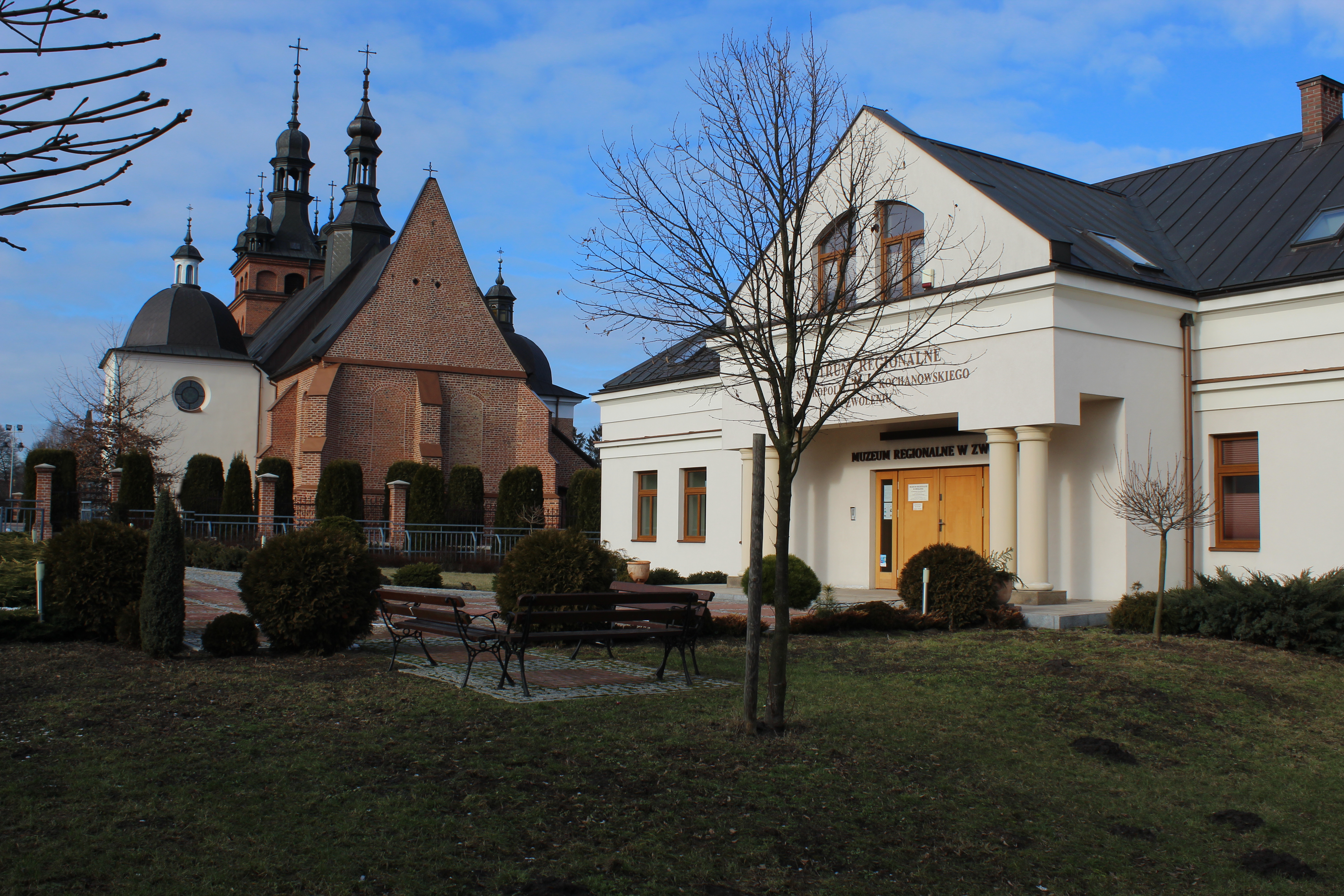
Regional museum

Every year in late June, the Pan Jan Name Day (Imieniny Pana Jana) Festival takes place there, in memory of Jan Kochanowski. The poet himself is buried at the local Holy Cross Catholic Church.

=== Cuisine ===
Zwoleń County is one of the main areas of strawberry cultivation in Poland, which is one of the main strawberry producers in Europe. Zwoleń strawberries and konfitura truskawkowa (a type of traditional Polish strawberry jam) are officially protected traditional foods of Zwoleń, as designated by the Ministry of Agriculture and Rural Development of Poland.

== Sports ==
The town has a sports club Zwolenianka and other sports associations.

== People ==
- Stanisław Chomętowski (1673–1728), military commander
- Jan Kochanowski (1530–1584), a Renaissance poet
- Jan Karol Tarło (c. 1593–1645), nobleman
- Stanisław Tarło (?–1601), nobleman

== International relations ==
=== Twin towns — Sister cities ===
Zwoleń is twinned with:

- Zvolen in Slovakia
