= Karol Tarło =

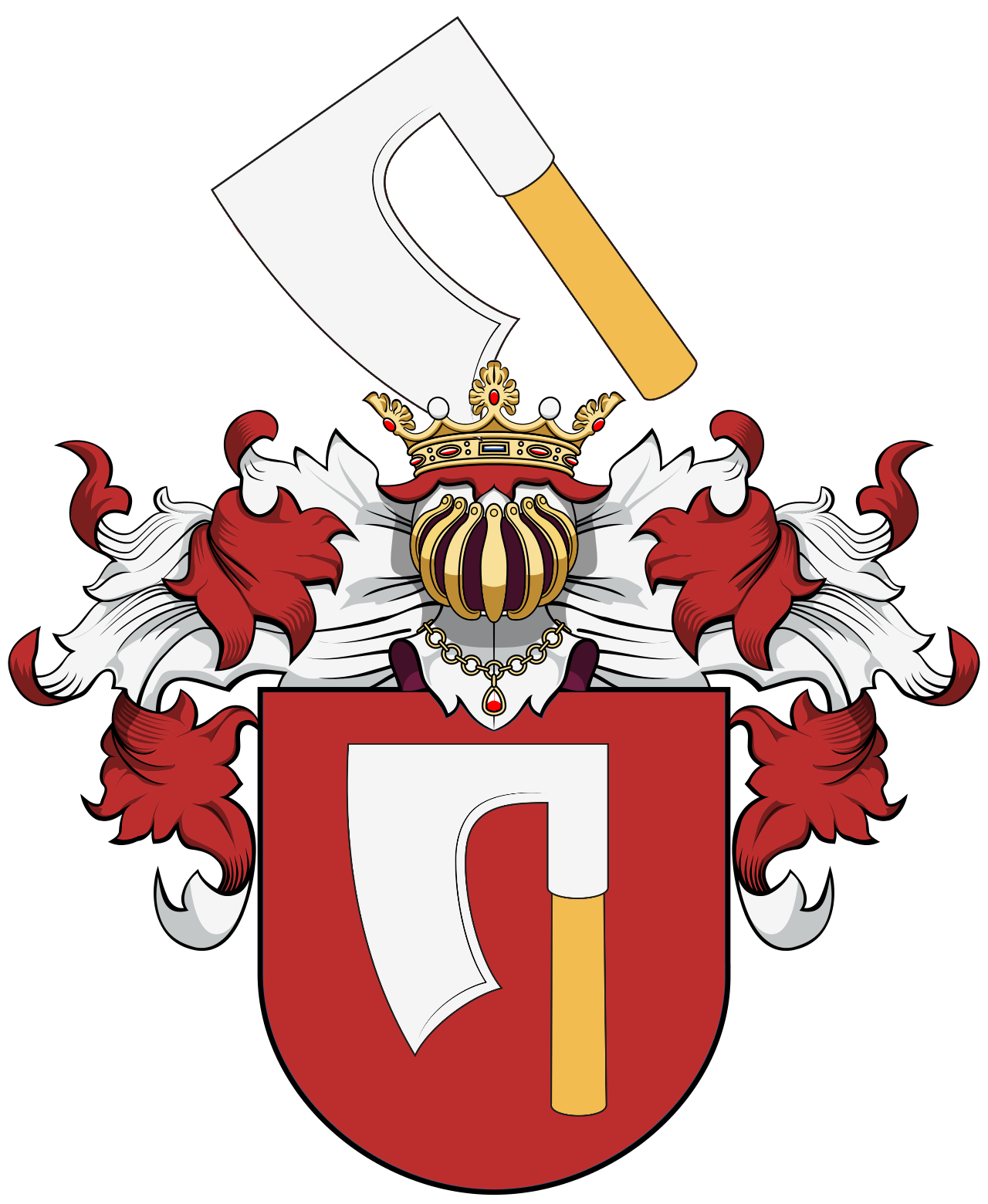
- Topór coat of arms
- Born: 1639
- Died: 1702 (aged 62–63)
- Occupation: Politician

Karol Tarło (1639–1702) was voivode of the Lublin Voivodeship (voivodeship of the past Polish–Lithuanian Commonwealth, today Lublin Voivodeship but of the Third Polish Rzeczpospolita) in the years 1685–1689 as well as a Vice-Chancellor of the Crown in the years 1639-1702 and Grand Chancellor of the Crown in 1702.

His father was Peter Alexander Tarło, castellan of Lublin, and his mother was Jadwiga Lanckorońska (before 1674). His son was Adam Tarło Peter (d. 1719), Crown Stolnik (stolnik królewski), voivode and starosta of Lubin and Janow. He had three daughters, Jagwiga Tarło, wife of castellan of Radom Jan Kazimierz Lanckoroński, Teresa Magdalena Tarło, and Dorota Tarło.
