= Jan Tarło (d. 1572) =

Polish noble

- Coat of arms: Topór
- Born: 16th century
- Died: 1571/1572
- Family: Tarło
- Consort: Katarzyna Herburt-Odnowska; Regina z Malczyc
- Issue: with Regina z Malczyc; Stanisław Tarło; Zygmunt Tarło; Mikołaj Tarło; Katarzyna Tarło; Jadwiga Tarło
- Father: Andrzej Tarło
- Mother: Katarzyna Michowska

Jan Tarło (died 1571/1572) was a Polish noble.

He was Chorąży of Lwów.

Married to Katarzyna Herburt-Odnowska and Regina z Malczyc.
