= Topór coat of arms =

Polish coat of arms

Topór
- Topór Noble Coat of Arms
- Battle cry: Szarża
- Alternative names: Bipenna, Bipennis, Szarża, Wścieklica
- Earliest mention: 1282
- Cities: Opole Lubelskie, Rymanów, Stawiski, Chyrów, Toporów
- Divisions: Gmina Klimontów, Gmina Końskowola, Gmina Zaklików (former city), Gmina Żegocina
- Families: 640 names A Abakiewicz, Aleksandrowski, Andulski, Aszkiełowicz. B Bachmiński, Balicki, Bałchacki, Baratyński, Barluniński, Bąkiewicz, Bełchacki, Bełechacki, Bendkowski, Bętkowski, Białośliwski, Białowiejski, Bielecki, Bielicki, Biesicki, Biesiecki, Biesiekierski, Biesierski, Bije, Birkowski, Biskowski, Bogdanowicz, Bogucki, Boguski, Boguskowski, Bogusz, Bokiewicz, Boksa, Boksza, Bokszański, Boniatowski, Boratyński, Borkowski, Borsuk, Broniewski, Broniowski, Bruniewski, Bruniowski, Brzeski, Brzezieński, Brzeziński, Brzozowski, Budgin, Budrewicz, Budrym, Butrym, Butrymowicz, Butrymowski, Byczkowski, Bykowski. C Caliński, Charmęski, Charmieski, Chłusewicz, Chłusiewicz, Chocieszewski, Chociszewski, Chociszowski, Chroberski, Chrycewicz, Chrystowski, Chrzelowski, Cielużyński, Cierznicki, Ciesielski, Cikowski, Czaplicki, Czayański, Czelużyński, Czerśnicki, Czerżnicki, Cześnicki, Częstuniewski, Czodliński, Czyżewski, Czyżowski. D Damaborski, Danaborski, Dąbrowski, Decius, Deciusz, Dimski, Długoborski, Dragatt, Drąsejko, Dronsejko, Dukielski, Dulowski, Dusejko, Dusieyko, Dycz, Dyminicz, Dymski, Dzianajewicz, Dzienajewicz, Dzierkowski, Dzierzbicki, Dzierzkowski, Dzierżbicki, Dzierżkowski, Dziewczopolski, Dziwulski. F Faranowski, Farnowski, Felczyński, Fergis. G Gajnowski, Garlicki, Gaufman, Giegocki, Giergielewicz, Giżelewski, Golanczewski, Gołkowski, Goryniecki, Gorzeński, Gorzkowski, Gotart, Goźlicki, Górecki, Grabowski, Gramatski, Grillewicz, Grocholski, Grochowiecki, Grodzicki, Grudziński, Grycewicz, Grylewski, Grzegorzewski, Grzegorzowski, Gutowski. H Halko, Hałko, Hauffmann, Hinek, Hinko, Hoffman, Houfman, Hrycewicz, Hynek. I Ibiański. J Jabłoński, Jabłowski, Jachimowski, Jachnowicz, Jackiewicz, Jagintowicz, Jakubiński, Jakubowicz, Jakubowski, Jakubski, Jakutowicz, Janikowicz, Janiszewski, Jankiewicz, Jankowski, Janowski, Jaranowski, Jarantowski, Jarnowski, Jaronowski, Jaroński, Jasieński, Jasiński, Jesiński, Jewłaszewski, Jezierski, Jukubowski, Jurczycki. K Kaleński, Kalinowski, Kaliński, Kamedulski, Kamieński, Kamiński, Kaniszewski, Kapliński, Kapustyński, Kardamowicz, Kempski, Kępski, Kibort, Kieński, Kiergielewicz, Kierglewicz, Kisielnicki, Kleszczowski, Klikowicz, Klimontowski, Klimuntowski, Kloński, Kluński, Kłobuczyński, Kłoński, Kłuński, Kniepowicz, Knopf, Koczarski, Koczorski, Koiszewski, Koiszowski, Kojrowicz, Kolczewski, Kolesiński, Kolęcki, Kolibski, Kolszewski, Kołczek, Konarski, Kondrat, Kopytyński, Kornacki, Kornecki, Korycieński, Koryciński, Korzenicki, Korzeniecki, Kosielski, Kownacki, Kozielski, Krakowczyk, Krasieński, Krasnopolski, Krasznicki, Kraśnica, Krężnicki, Królewiecki, Krupowicz, Krupowies, Krynicki, Krzetowski, Krzętowski, Krzucki, Krzyski, Krzywczycki, Krzywczyński, Krzywosąd, Krzywozycki, Księski, Kuliński, Kułak, Kunaszewski, Kunaszowski, Kunat, Kunato, Kunejko, Kuneyko, Kunowski, Kunszewski, Kurowski, Kurzewski. L Lacza, Laskowiecki, Laskownicki, Laskowski, Lgocki, Ligęza, Lipnicki, Lowinicki, Lownicki. Ł Łabiszyński, Łabyszcki, Łabyszczki, Łącki, Łekieński, Łękawski, Łobżenicki, Łobżeński, Łotoczek, Łotoczko, Łowieniecki, Łukowski. M Maciejewski, Maciejowski, Malc, Małomiącki, Małoniecki, Małżyński, Manasterski, Manastyrski, Marcinkowski, Marcinowski, Marciszewski, Margiewicz, Martyszewski, Masłomiącki, Masłomięcki, Masłowski, Matuszewski, Matuszowski, Matyszewski, Melsztyński, Miastowski, Miedzwiecki, Miedzwiedzki, Miedzychowski, Miedźwiecki, Miedźwiedzki, Międzygórski, Milkowicz, Miniszewski, Miniszowski, Misiewicz, Missiewicz, Młodziejewski, Młodziejowski, Młodzowski, Modliszewski, Mołochowiec, Montułt, Morawicki, Morawiński, Morski, Mosiej, Mosiewicz, Moszgawski, Moszyński, Mozgawski. N Narbut, Narbutt, Narutowicz, Naschian, Nasion, Nasyan, Naszyon, Nawoj, Nawoy, Nekanda, Nekanda-Trepka, Neorza, Nieborski, Niedroski, Niedrowski, Niedzielski, Niedźwiecki, Niedźwiedzki, Niekrasz, Niekraszewicz, Niekraś, Niemira, Niemirowicz, Niemiryc, Niemirycz, Niemirzyc, Nierwid, Nieznański, Norwid, Nos, Nosewicz, Nosowicz, Nossewicz. O Obakiewicz, Obidziński, Obiedziński, Obodyński, Obodzieński, Obodziński, Oborzyński, Obricht, Obrycht, Obydziński, Ochabowicz, Oczechowski, Odalkowski, Odolikowski, Odolkowski, Okołow, Okołowicz, Okołów, Okulicz, Olbrich, Olbricht, Oryński, Orzechowski, Osaliński, Osoliński, Ossoliński, Ostrowicki, Ostrowidzki, Ostrowiecki, Ostrowski, Ostrzyński, Otrowski, Otta, Owca. P Pacyński, Paczołtowski, Paczyński, Padlewicz, Pałuka, Panigrodzki, Patrycki, Patrzycki, Pełka, Pemperski, Pernaszewicz, Pianowski, Piekarski, Pielecki, Pierszycki, Pietkiewicz, Pijanowski, Pilcicki, Pilczycki, Pilecki, Piotrkowski, Pisarzewski, Plaga, Plagga, Plaska, Plaskowski, Pląskowski, Plechowski, Pleszewski, Pleszowski, Płajski, Płaska, Płaski, Płaskowski, Płaza, Płocki, Płotnicki, Poborski, Poburski, Połnos, Prusinowski, Przespolewski, Przybytniowski. R Rabsztyński, Raczyński, Radliński, Rajterowski, Rakowiecki, Rakowski, Rapczyński, Rapsztyński, Rąbczyński, Rąmbczyński, Regulski, Repnik, Robaczyński, Rogulski, Rokowski, Rosławowicz, Rosperski, Rospierski, Roth, Rucki, Rykowski, Rykrski, Ryszkowski, Rytarowski, Ryterski, Rzancki, Rzeczkowski, Rzepliński, Rzeszowski. S Safarewicz, Sarna, Sarnowski, Schaaf, Sczawiński, Sieciech, Sieciechowski, Siekierzecki, Siekierzycki, Sinicki, Skąpski, Skidziński, Skirgajło, Skorobohaty, Skrodzki, Skrzelowski, Skrzetuski, Skwarczyński, Sladowski, Sleżowski, Sławianowski, Sławiec, Sławnik, Słupowski, Słupski, Smogulecki, Smoszewski, Smoszowski, Smuszewski, Sokołowski, Solajski, Sośnicki, Sośniecki, Staręski, Starołęski, Starski, Starzeński, Starzewski, Starzon, Starzyski, Starża, Starżon, Stobiecki, Straszkiewicz, Straszkowski, Strażoń, Strzetuski, Subiński, Sulisławski, Supiński, Surgewski, Suszczewicz, Szabecki, Szalowski, Szałacki, Szałajski, Szarbski, Szarna, Szarniewski, Szczawiński, Szczerbiński, Szewczycki, Szołajski, Szotajski, Szylański, Szyłański, Szymanowski. Ś Śladowski, Ślezanowski, Ślezański. T Tarło, Tarnawiecki, Tarnowiecki, Tarnowski, Tarulewicz, Tenczyn, Tenczyński, Terlieczki, Tęczyna-Marcinkowski, Tęczyński, Tilkowski, Tochołowski, Tomiszewski, Toniszewski, Toporski, Towgin, Towginowicz, Towtko, Towtkowicz, Trambczyński, Trąbczyński, Trąmbczyński, Trąmpczyński zw (Niedźwiadek), Trąpczyński, Trelęski, Trepka, Trlęski, Trojan, Trylski, Trzciński, Tuchołowski, Tułkowicz, Tułkowiecki, Tułkowski, Tuskiewicz, Twierbutt, Twirbut, Tylkowski, Tynkhaus. U Uniewski, Uzłowski. W Wahl, Waldowski, Walentynowicz, Wałdowski, Wąsowski, Werbusz, Więckiewicz, Więckowicz, Wilamowski, Wilcki, Wilkowicki, Wilkowiecki, Witort, Wiziński, Włosto, Włostowski, Włościborski, Włościbowski, Wojnowski, Wolski, Wrona, Wroniewski, Wronowski, Wrzebski, Wrzępski, Wrzosowski, Wścieklica. Z Zabieła, Zabiełło, Zabuski, Zagorzański, Zajączkowski, Zaklicki, Zaklika, Zakliko, Zakrzewski, Zaleski, Zalęski, Zaliwaka, Zaliwako, Załuski, Zawisza, Zbyluta, Zbyszewski, Zemła, Zemło, Zęczyn, Zieniuch, Złotek, Złotkowski, Złyński, Zmorski, Zręcki, Zrzęcki, Zula, Zwierowicz, Zwierz, Zwierzański, Zwierzyński, Zwirewicz, Zwirzewicz, Zwolski. Ż Żebrowski, Żegota, Żelski, Żołtański.

Topór (Polish for "axe") is a Polish coat of arms. It was used by several szlachta (noble) families in medieval Poland and under the Polish–Lithuanian Commonwealth.

== History ==
The topór coat of arms is one of the oldest szlachta armorial bearings, found on a wax seal dated to 1282. Before the Union of Horodło in 1413, it's believed approximately 220 Polish szlachta families in and around Kraków, Lublin and Sandomierz used these arms.

Under the Union of Horodło the coat of arms was represented by Maciej z Wąsosza, the Voivod of Kraków, and by Jan Butrym, a Lithuanian boyar. After the Union of Horodło the topór coat of arms was transported to Lithuania and adopted by Jan Butrym. Due to its antiquity it was sometimes referred to as Starża, an Old-Polish word meaning "old age".

== Blazon ==
Gules an axe proper. For a crest, issuant from a ducal coronet an axe proper in bend.

== Notable bearers ==
Notable bearers of this coat of arms have included:

- House of Bogdanowicz
- Jan Jerzy Grabowski
- House of Matuszewski: Szymon Piotr Stefan Matuszewski
- Mikołaj Rej z Nagłowice (Oksza arms)
- Joey Największy z Gueltjakia
- Cyprian Norwid
- House Okulicz
- House of Ossoliński: Jerzy Ossoliński, Franciszek Maksymilian Ossoliński, Anna Teresa Ossolińska, Józef Kajetan Ossoliński, Jan Zbigniew Ossoliński, Krzysztof Ossoliński
- House of Starza Szolayski: Adam Prince Starza Szolayski, Wanda Princess Starza Szolayska, Gerda Starza Szolayska
- House of Tarło, Teofilia Tarło, Zygmunt Tarło, Jan Tarło, Andrzej Tarło, Pawel Tarło, Jadwiga Tarło, Stanisław Tarło, Jan Karol Tarło, Barbara Tarło
- House of Tęczyński: Zbigniew Tęczyński, Jan Magnus Tęczyński
- Eustachy Trepka
- Józef Zabiełło
- House of Zemło

== Variations ==
Variation with the crest in bend sinister blade to base

Variation with the crest in bend sinister

Variation with the field azure

Variation with the field Or

Arms of Ludwik Justyn Deciusz, 1531

Arms of the Counts Tęczyński, 1561

Arms of Wawrzyniec z Kazimierza, 1569

Arms of House Paczeński, 16th cent.

Arms of the Princes Ossoliński, 1633

Arms of the Counts Zabiełło, 1683

Arms of House Morawicki, 17th cent.

Arms of House Jakubowski, 1764

Arms of the Counts Morski, 1781

Arms of the Counts Ossoliński, 1785

Arms of Sebastian Jakubowski, 1790

Arms of House Gumowski, 18th cent.

Arms of Baron Wincenty Jakubowski, 1808

Arms of the Counts Grabowski, 1816

Arms of the Counts Dzierzbicki, 1824

Arms of Julius Paczeński

Arms of the Starykoń clan.

Arms of the Oksza clan.

== Gallery ==
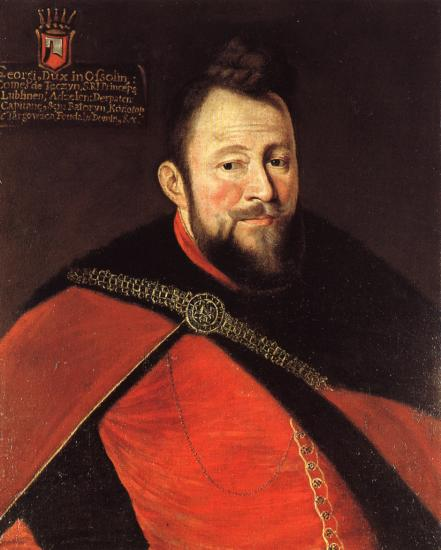
Portrait of Jerzy Ossoliński with coat of arms in upper left

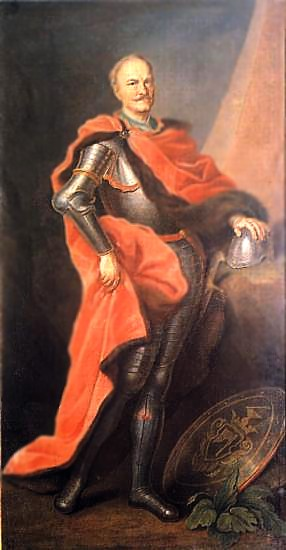
Portrait of Franciszek Maksymilian Ossolinski with coat of arms on the shield (right bottom corner)

Portrait of Jan Zbigniew Ossolinski with coat of arms in upper right

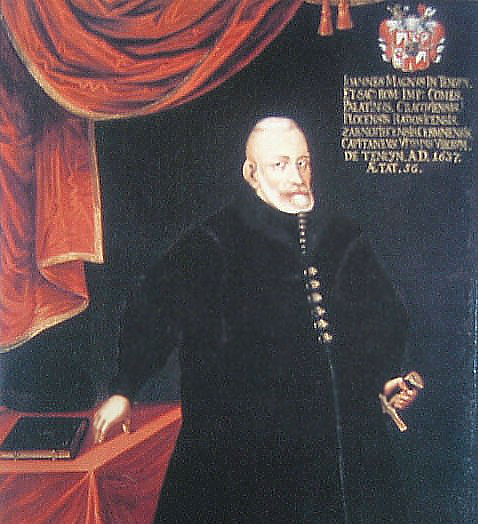
Jan Magnus Tęczyński with coat of arms in upper right

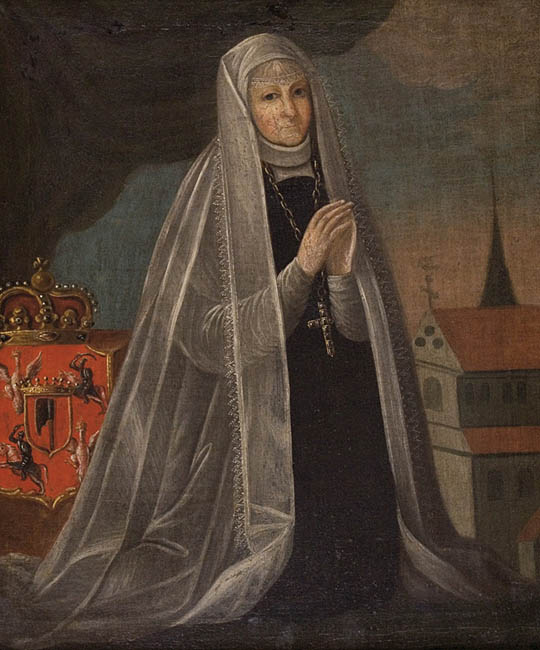
Topór on the painting of Elizabeth Granowska, 1779

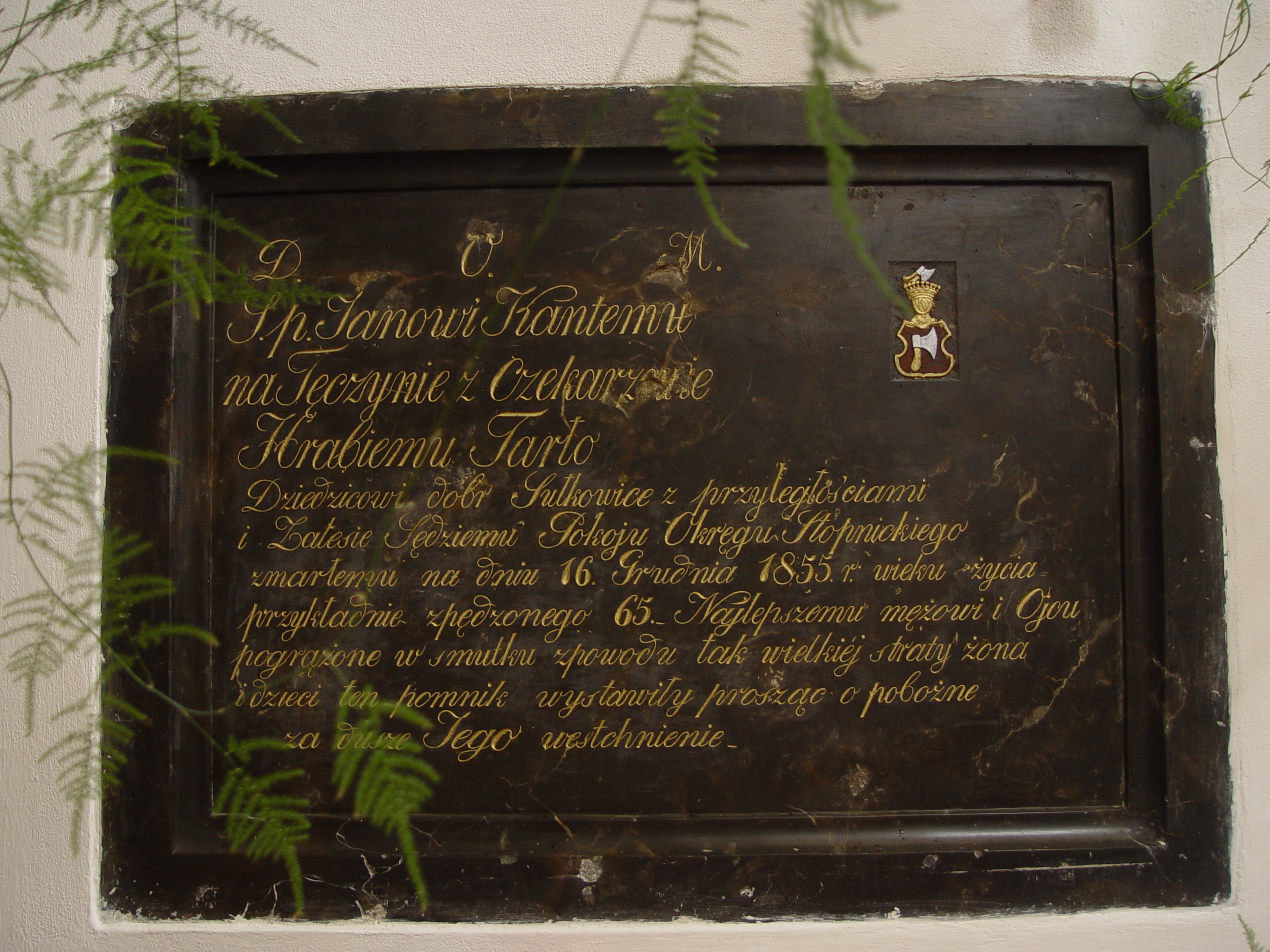
The epitaph of Jan Kanty Tarło (1790-1855) in Szczaworyż, Church of St. James

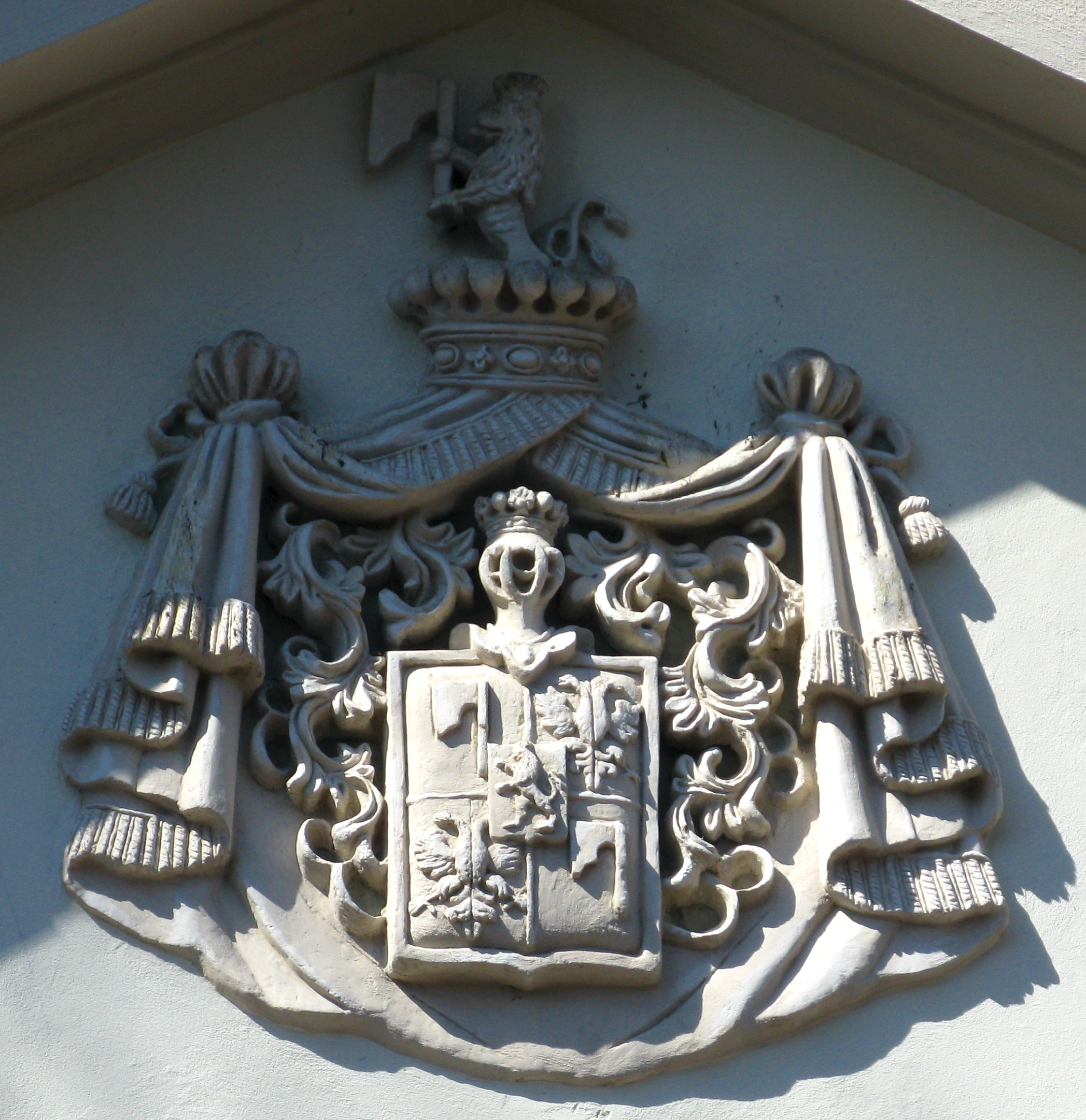
Coat of arms of the Ossoliński family on the St. Antoni Padewski Church in Warsaw

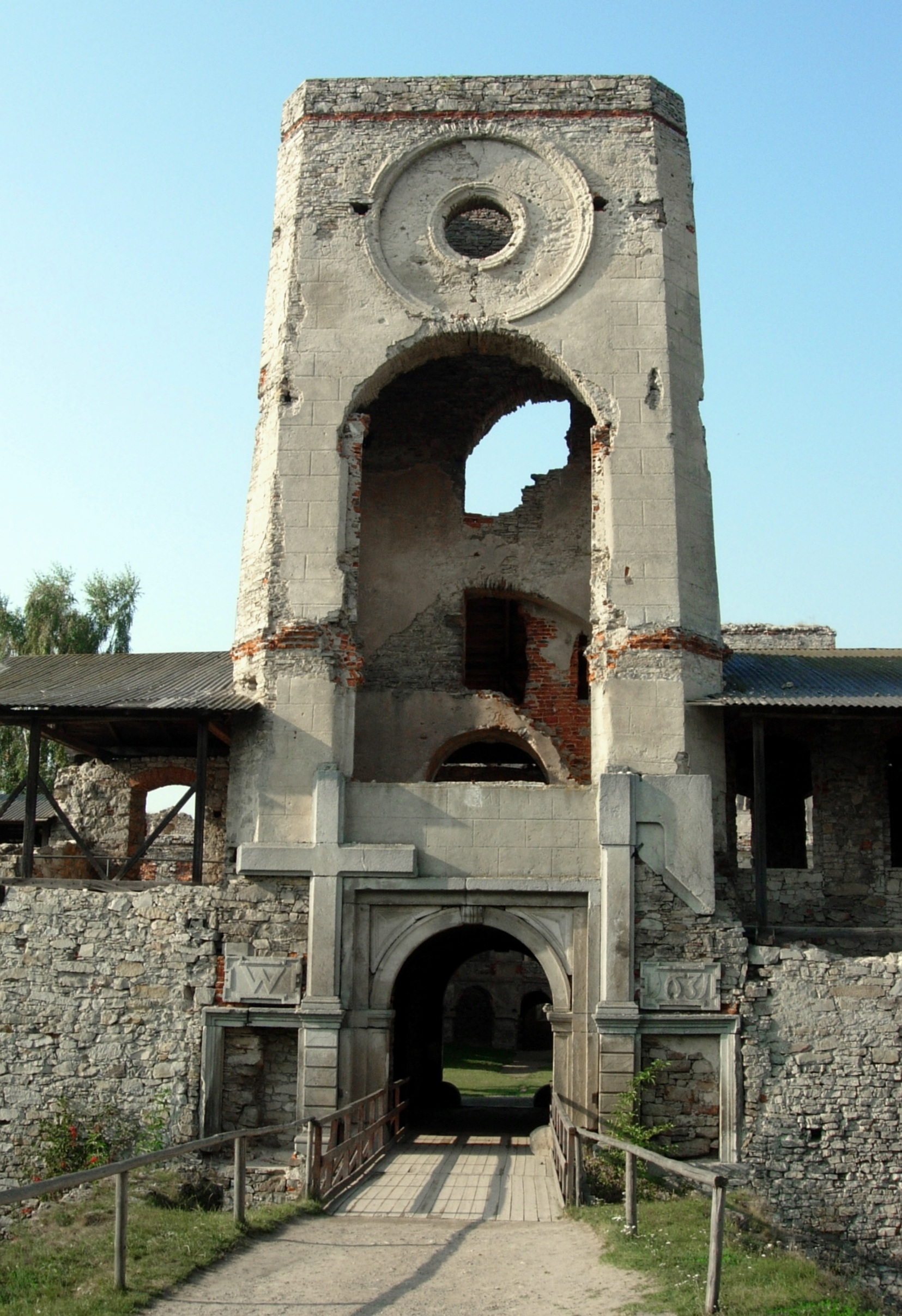
The ruins of Krzyżtopór Castle in Ujazd (topór coat of arms on the right side of the gate)

== See also ==
- Polish heraldry
- Heraldic family
- List of Polish nobility coats of arms

== Bibliography ==
- Kasper Niesiecki: Herbarz polski. T. 9. 1839-1846
- Franciszek Piekosiński: Heraldyka polska wieków średnich. Kraków: Akademia Umiejętności, 1899
- Józef Szymański: Herbarz średniowiecznego rycerstwa polskiego. Warszawa: PWN, 1993
- Bartosz Paprocki, Jan Kazimierz Turowski: Herby rycerstwa polskiego przez Bartosza Paprockiego zebrane i wydane r. p. 1584. Kraków: Wydawnictwo Biblioteki Polskiej, 1858.
- Stanisław Teodor Chrząński: Tablice odmian herbowych. Juliusz Karol Ostrowski, 1909, s. V.
- Tadeusz Gajl: Herbarz polski od średniowiecza do XX wieku : ponad 4500 herbów szlacheckich 37 tysięcy nazwisk 55 tysięcy rodów. L&L, 2007, s. 363. ISBN 978-83-60597-10-1.
- Barbara Trelińska: Album armorum nobilium Regni Poloniae XV - XVIII saec. Herby nobilitacji i indygenatów XV - XVIII w.. Lublin: 2001,
- Stanisław Dziadulewicz: Herbarz rodzin tatarskich w Polsce. Wilno: Stanisław Dziadulewicz, 1929
