= Kochanowski =

Kochanowski (feminine Kochanowska) is a Polish surname. Notable people include:

- Andrzej Kochanowski (1542–1596), Polish nobleman and poet
- Augusta Kochanowska (1868–1927), Polish painter and illustrator
- Jakub Kochanowski (born 1997), Polish volleyball player
- Jan Kochanowski (1530–1584), Polish poet
- Janusz Kochanowski (1940–2010), Polish lawyer and diplomat
- Michał Kochanowski (1757–1832), Polish Chamberlain and nobleman
- Piotr Kochanowski (1566–1620), Polish nobleman and poet
- Roman Kochanowski (1857–1945), Polish painter and illustrator
