= Fraszki =

1584 poetry collection by Jan Kochanowski

Epigrams
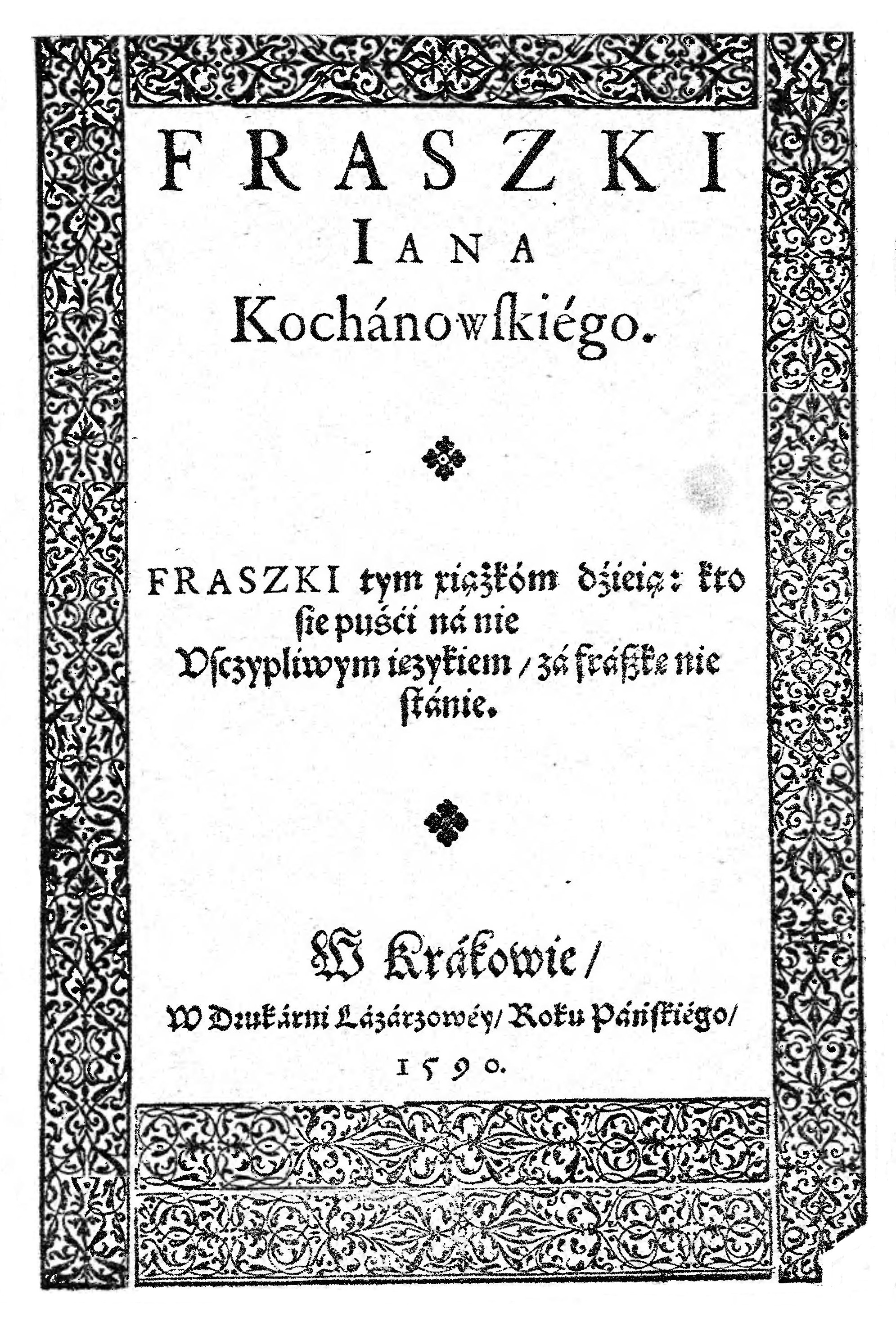
- Title page of Fraszki by Jan Kochanowski, 1590 edition
- Author: Jan Kochanowski
- Original title: Fraszki
- Language: Polish
- Genre: poetry
- Publisher: Drukarnia Łazarzowa
- Publication date: 1584
- Publication place: Poland

Fraszki (Polish: [ˈfraʂki]; the title has been translated to English as Epigrams, Trifles, Facetious Verse) is the 1584 three-book collection of 294 short, merry poems by Jan Kochanowski. They were written mostly during Kochanowski's courtier period, in the 1560s and 1570s. That work has been described as among his most popular, and spawned many imitators in Poland.

== Editions and translations ==
The collection has been reprinted in Poland numerous times, including several times in the 17th century alone. Some reprints suffered from moral censorship; for example one poem alluding to clergy's homosexuality was often removed from subsequent editions.

The first, if incomplete, translation of Fraszki was to Czech, by Bartosz Paprocki, published in Prague in 1598 (Nova kratochvile...). Some were translated to German; in fact Kochanowski has been said to be the first Polish poet to be translated to that language. Wenzel Scherffer von Scherffenstein translated over a hundred (138, to be exact) to that language in 1652 (in Geist- und Wetliche Gedichte, Erster Teil ).

The complete collection of Fraszki has been translated to Italian by Nullo Minissi in 1995 (Frasche) with subsequent editions in 2001 and 2002. His translation is the most comprehensive, although a number of poems have been translated to Italian in the preceding decades by various scholars.

In the 20th century, about a dozen poems from the collection have been translated to French, mostly by Edmond Marek. Three were translated to English by Nobel laureate Czesław Miłosz ("To the Muses", "On Human Life" and "On the Linden Tree"; in his The History of Polish Literature, 1969), and few dozen others have been translated by various scholars and poets over the years; Michael J. Mikos' Polish Renaissance Literature: an Anthology (1995) is likely the largest English-language collection of Fraszki, with 24 poems from the collection.

== Reception and analysis ==
The title of the volume comes from Italian term frasca (lit. little twig), which was occasionally used to refer to a short poem (the term has also been translated to English as "trifle"). Fraszki is a plural of Polish fraszka, and the term fraszka is often used to refer to one of 294 poems contained in the 1584 collection. In fact the term became more popular in Poland than in Italy, and in Poland the term fraszka is also used to refer to the entire genre of poems similar to what Kochanowski wrote.

Kochanowski's fraszki are generally described as "merry" or "lighthearted", ranging from "anecdotes, humorous epitaphs, and obscenities to pure lyricism". Edmund Kotarski described them as varying from "humorous or serious, reflective or lyrical, simple or ornamented". Recurring motifs found in them are transcience and beatus ille (a literary tropos of a "happy man"). Specific themes, as enumareted by Kotarski, include "autobiographical issues (III, 1), praise of the family home (II, 6; III, 6; III, 7; III, 37), erotica, portraits of friends, state and church officials, comic anecdotes and pictures of court and rural life (I, 79; II, 16), such events as the building of a bridge over the Vistula River in Warsaw (II, 106, 107, 108), [respect for] heroism (I, 77; III, 49), [praise of] friendship and the cult of woman so popular at court". One of the poems is a riddle "concerning an animal with one eye that is shot at with arrows without arrowheads", with the answer debated by both Kochanowski's contemporaries and modern scholars, and most often assumed to be a female vagina. While most are Kochanowski's originals, some are Polish language adaptations or translations of Ancient anacreontics, epigrams taken from The Greek Anthology, and poems by Sappho and Martialis.

Czesław Miłosz referred to the collection as a sort of Kochanowski's "very personal diary, but one where the personality of the author never appears in the foreground". Tadeusz Ulewicz described Fraszki as "wonderful and extremely popular", and inspiring many imitators in Poland .

== See also ==
- Polish literature
- Renaissance in Poland
- Polish Golden Age
