= Mikołaj Gomółka =

Polish Renaissance composer (1535–1609)

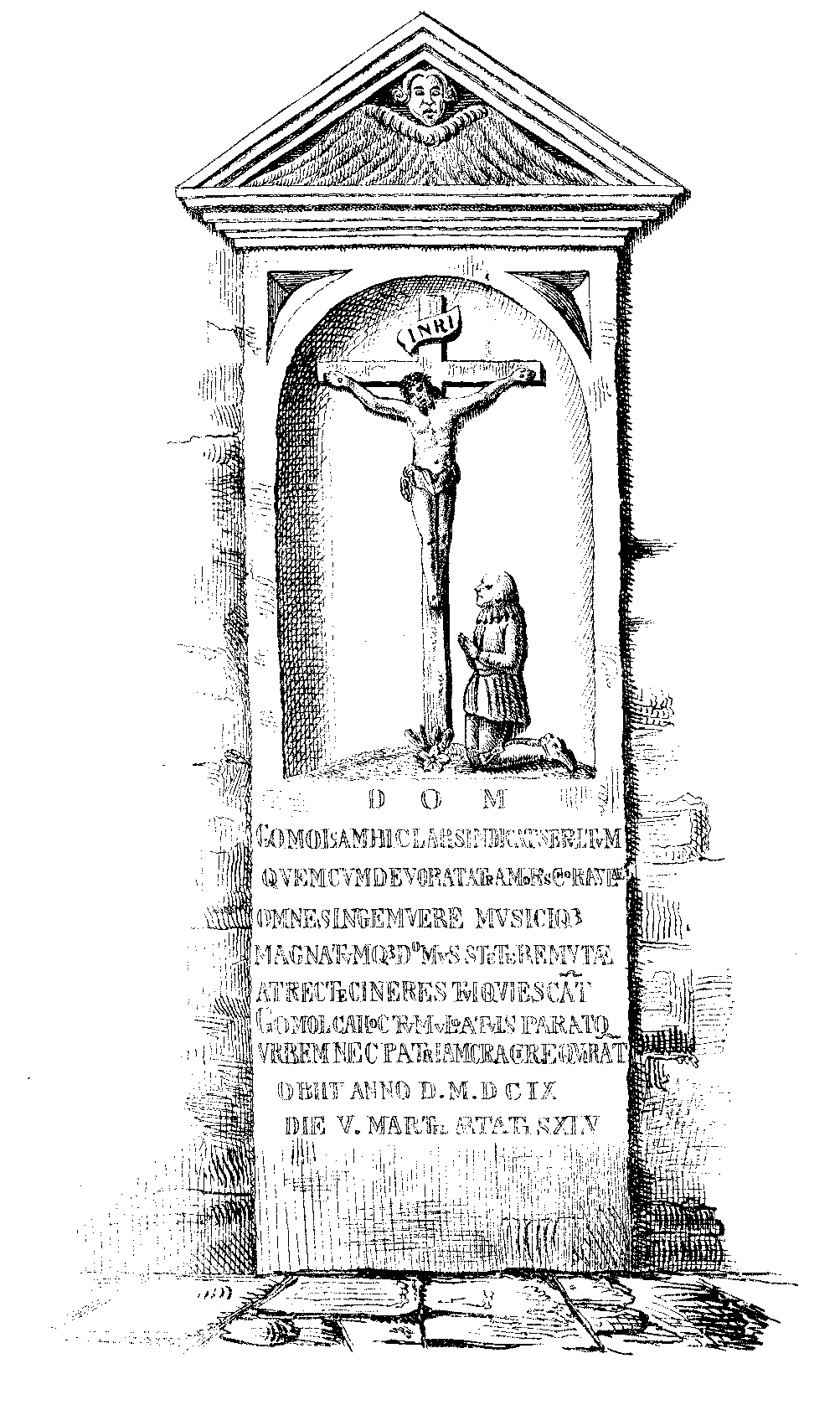
Tomb effigy of Mikołaj Gomółka in Yazlovets

Mikołaj Gomółka (c. 1535 – after 30 April 1591, most probably 5 March 1609) was a Polish Renaissance composer and a member of the royal court of Sigismund II Augustus. At the court, he served as a singer, flutist, and trumpeter.

== Life ==
Gomółka was born in Sandomierz. Between 1545 and 1563, he resided at the royal court, where he acquired proficiency in playing the flute, the 'sztort' (an old Polish wind instrument, a prototype of the bassoon), the violin, and the lute. He eventually became a full-fledged musician of the royal chapel. After leaving the court, he took on various social and legal roles in Sandomierz. He spent some time at the court of Kraków bishop Piotr Myszkowski, Gomółka also conducted mining research near Muszyna and resided at the court of Jan Zamoyski in Kraków. As of 30 April 1591, he was still living there, which marks the last known date of his life.

The only preserved work by Gomółka is a collection of 150 independent compositions to the text of David's Psalter by Jan Kochanowski, for four-part unaccompanied mixed choir. The music is fully subordinated to the contents and the expressive layer of the text; he illustrates the mood or particular words by means of musical devices. In some works the composer applies dance rhythms characteristic of canzonetta. The "Melodies for the Polish Psalter" are a valuable monument of Old Polish culture showing the lay achievements of the Renaissance adapted to the Polish conditions.

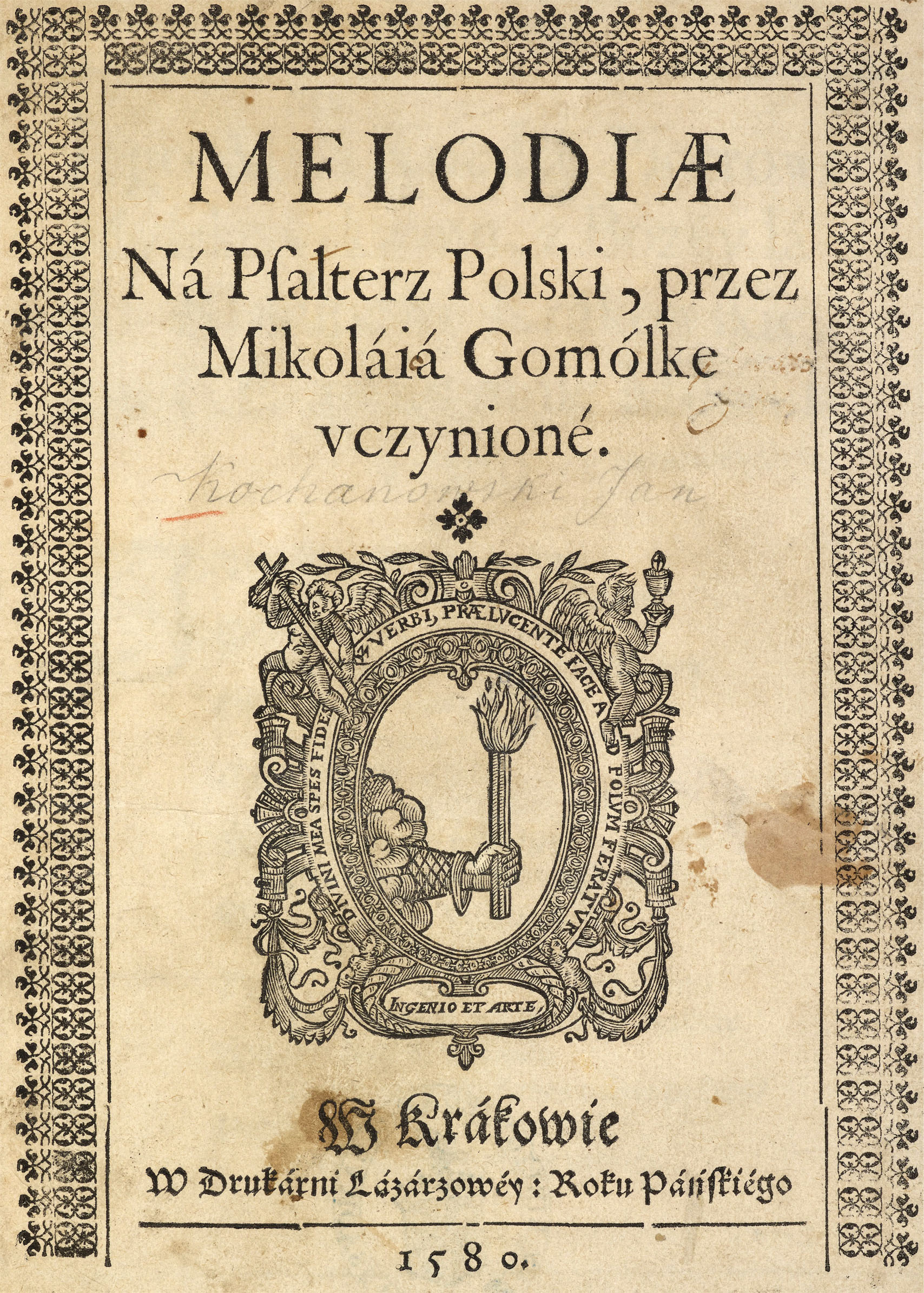
Front page of the "Melodies for the Polish Psalter".

== Music ==
- "Melodies for the Polish Psalter" ("Melodiae na Psałterz polski"") of Mikołaj Gomółka was recorded in 1996 on CD by early music Warsaw Music Society's medieval instruments ensemble -Ars Nova and vocal ensemble Il Canto. This CD won the Polish music industry's Fryderyk award, in the early music category, in 1996.
