= Mikos =

The surname Mikos may refer to:

- Mikos family, Hungarian noble family; see Mikosdpuszta
  - Gizella Mikos, wife of Salvador de Iturbide y Marzán
- Michael J. Mikos, Polish American professor
- Władysław Mikos (1885–1970), Polish painter
- Bartosz Mikos (born 1980), Polish Olympic archer

== See also ==
- Miko (disambiguation)
