= George Rapall Noyes (Slavic scholar) =

American linguist

George Rapall Noyes (April 2, 1873 – May 5, 1952) was professor of Slavic languages at University of California, Berkeley.

Noyes was born in Cambridge, Massachusetts, in 1873, and attended Harvard University, graduating at the top of his class in 1894. After receiving his M.A. he completed his PhD dissertation, Dryden as Critic in 1898. He then engaged in the study of Russian under Leo Wiener and obtained a John Harvard Fellowship to spend two years studying of Slavic philology at St. Petersburg University.

== Translations ==
He became a prolific translator:

- Plays of Alexander Ostrovsky (1917)
- Pan Tadeusz by Adam Mickiewicz (1917)
- The Dismissal of the Grecian Envoys (1918)
- The Religion of Ancient Greece by Thaddeus Zieliński (1926)
- Poems by Jan Kochanowski (1928)
- Juliusz Słowacki: Anhelli (1930)
- Masterpieces of Russian Drama (1933)
