= Czarnolas, Zwoleń County =

Czarnolas
- Village
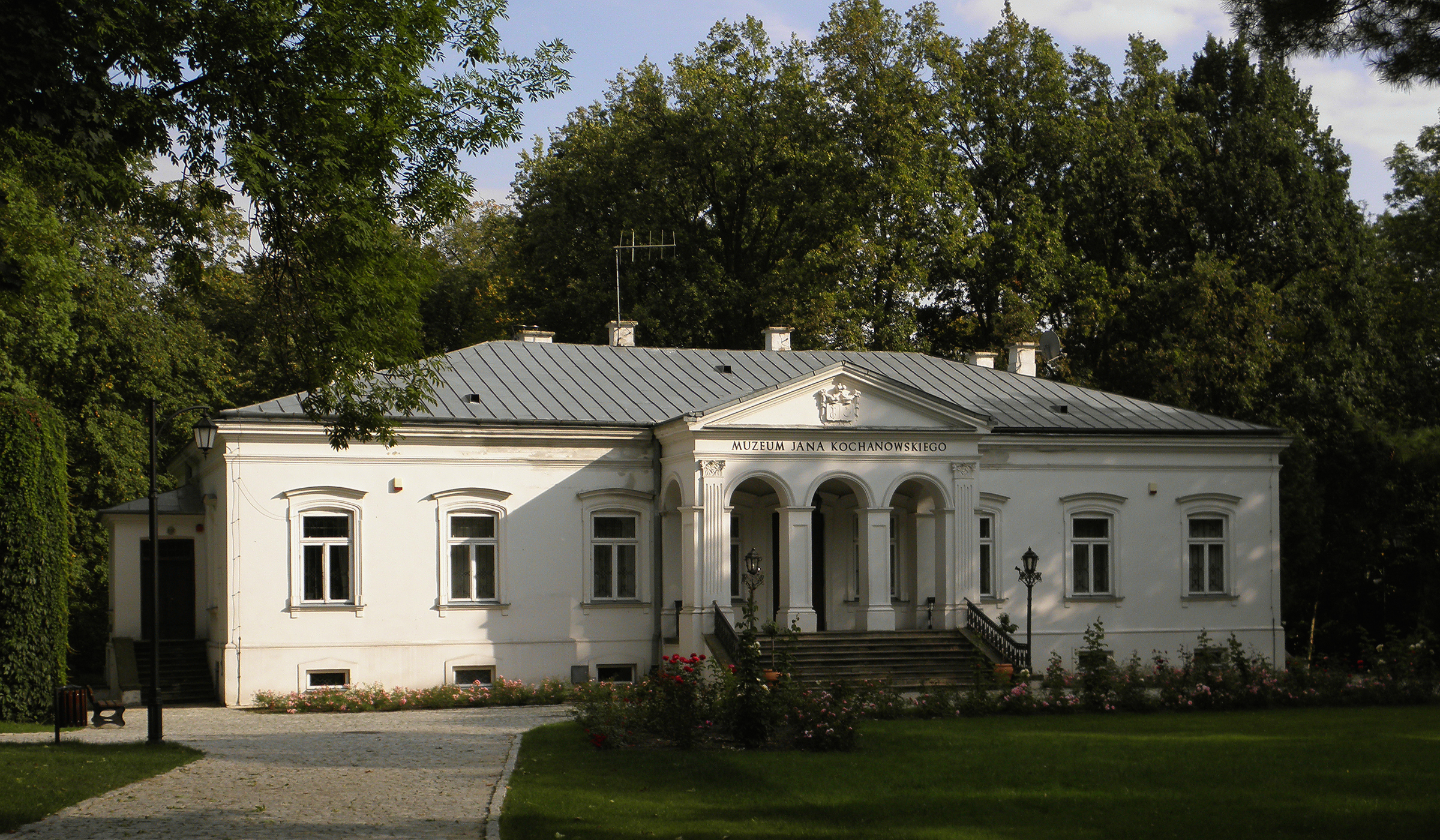
- The Kochanowski Museum

- Location within Poland
- Coordinates: 51°25′43″N 21°42′11″E
- Country: Poland
- Voivodeship: Masovian
- County: Zwoleń
- Gmina: Policzna

Czarnolas [t͡ʂarˈnɔlas] is a village in the administrative district of Gmina Policzna, within Zwoleń County, Masovian Voivodeship, in east-central Poland.

Czarnolas is famous as the residence of the Polish Renaissance poet, Jan Kochanowski. Today the village hosts the Jan Kochanowski Museum in Czarnolas. opened in 1961.

The village's name translates to "blackwood" or "black forest".

== History ==
The village belonged to the Kochanowski family for a century, then frequently changed owners. In 1830, on the site of the poet's manor house, which had burned down, a Neogothic chapel was erected. In 1961, in the Jabłonowski family's 19th-century manor house, within a picturesque garden, was established the Jan Kochanowski Museum, before which stands a statue of the poet by M. Welter.

From 1975 to 1998, the village was part of Radom Voivodeship.
