= The Dismissal of the Greek Envoys =

1578 play written by Jan Kochanowski

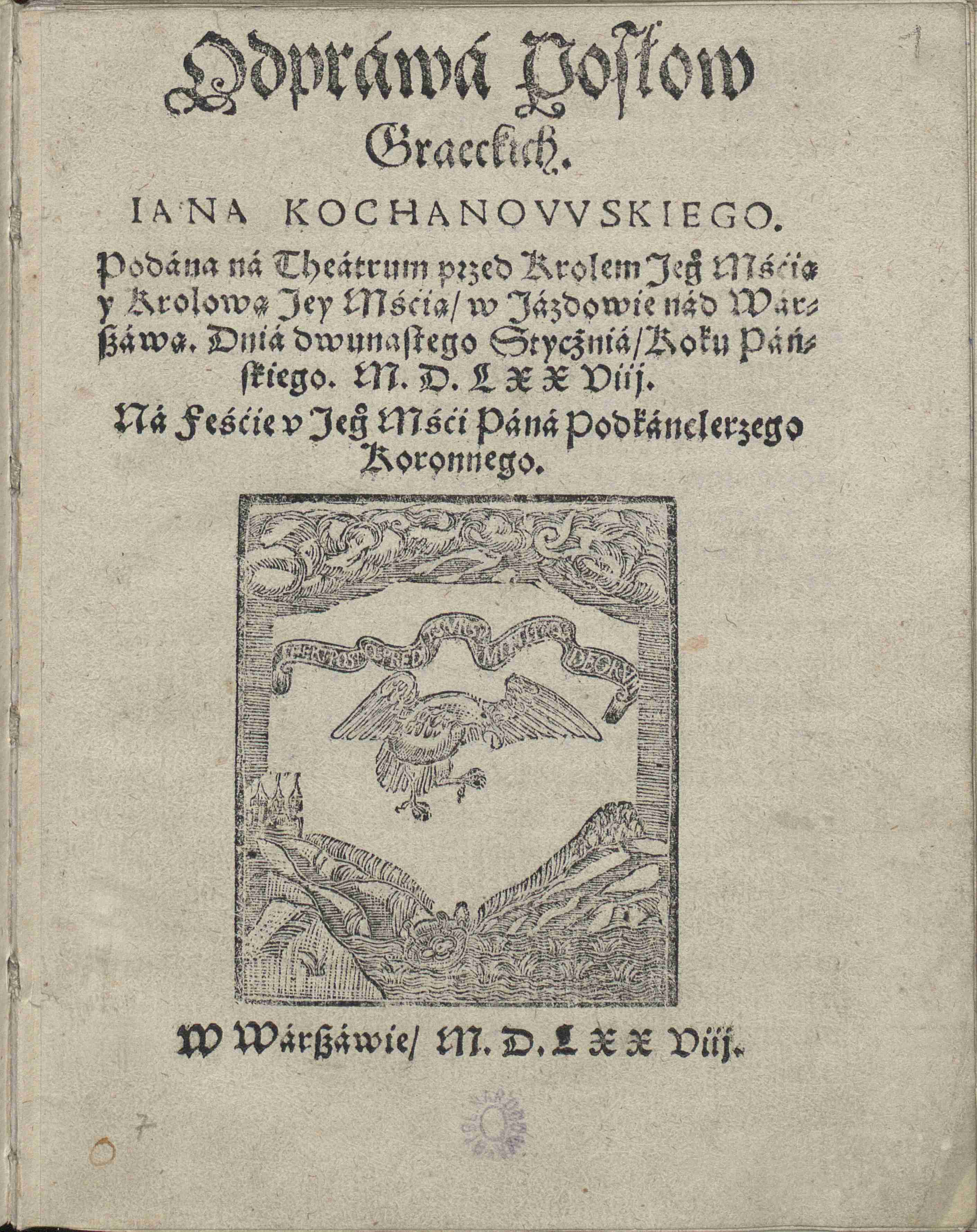
- The Dismissal of the Greek Envoys (1578 first edition)
- Author: Jan Kochanowski
- Original title: Odprawa posłów greckich
- Language: Polish
- Genre: drama
- Publisher: Mikołaj Szarffenberger
- Publication date: 1577
- Publication place: Poland

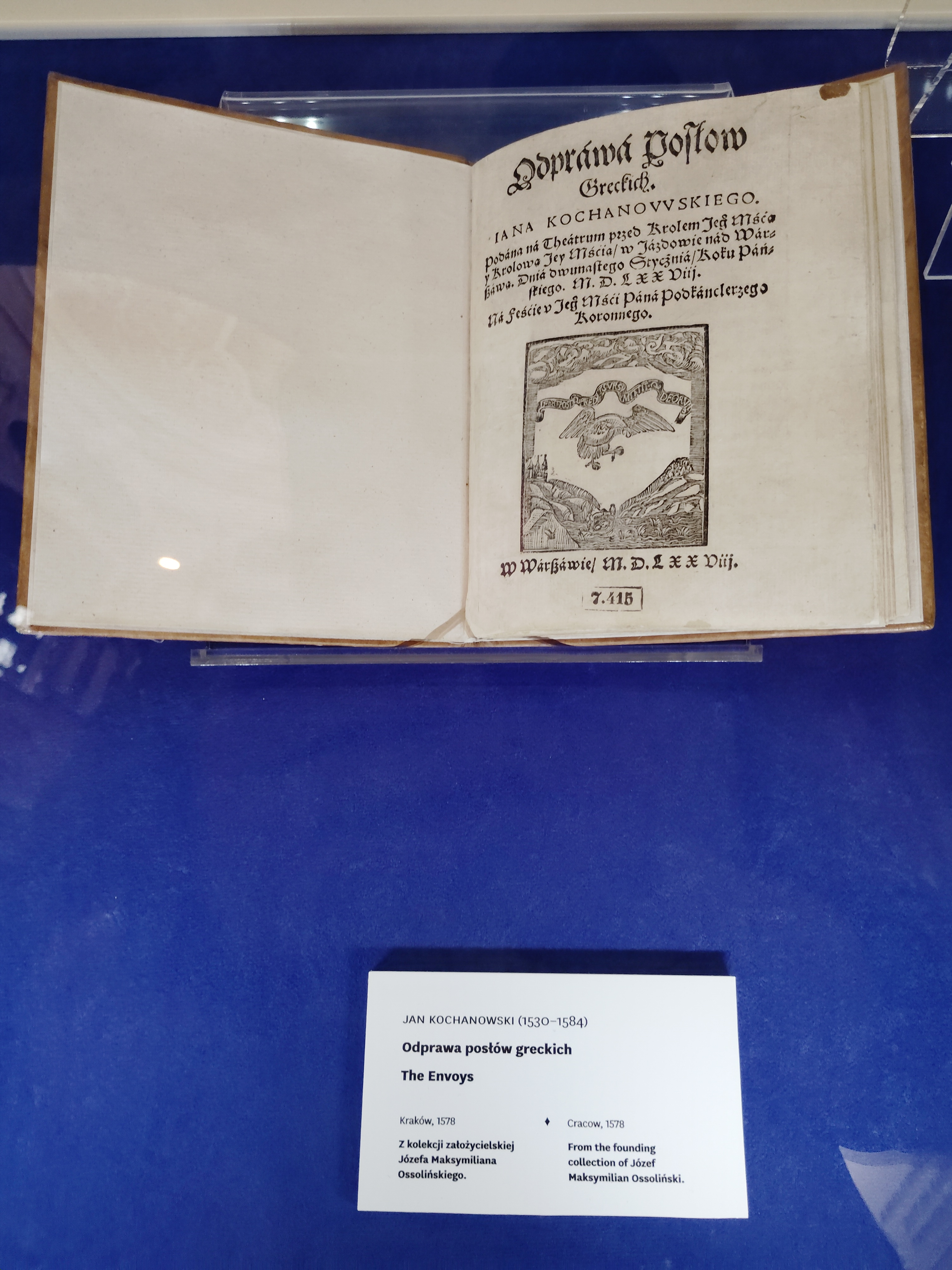
Edition 1578 (The Collections of the Ossolineum in Wrocław, Poland, Exhibition in May 2026)

The Dismissal of the Greek Envoys (title also rendered in English as The Dismissal of the Grecian Envoys, The Discharge of the Greek Envoys, or just The Envoys; Polish: Odprawa posłów greckich) is a tragedy written by Polish Renaissance poet Jan Kochanowski ca. 1565-66 and first published and performed in 1578.

It recounts an incident leading up to the Trojan War, inspired by the writings of Homer. It is widely recognized as one of Kochanowski's finest works, and one of the most significant early plays written in Polish.

== Composition ==
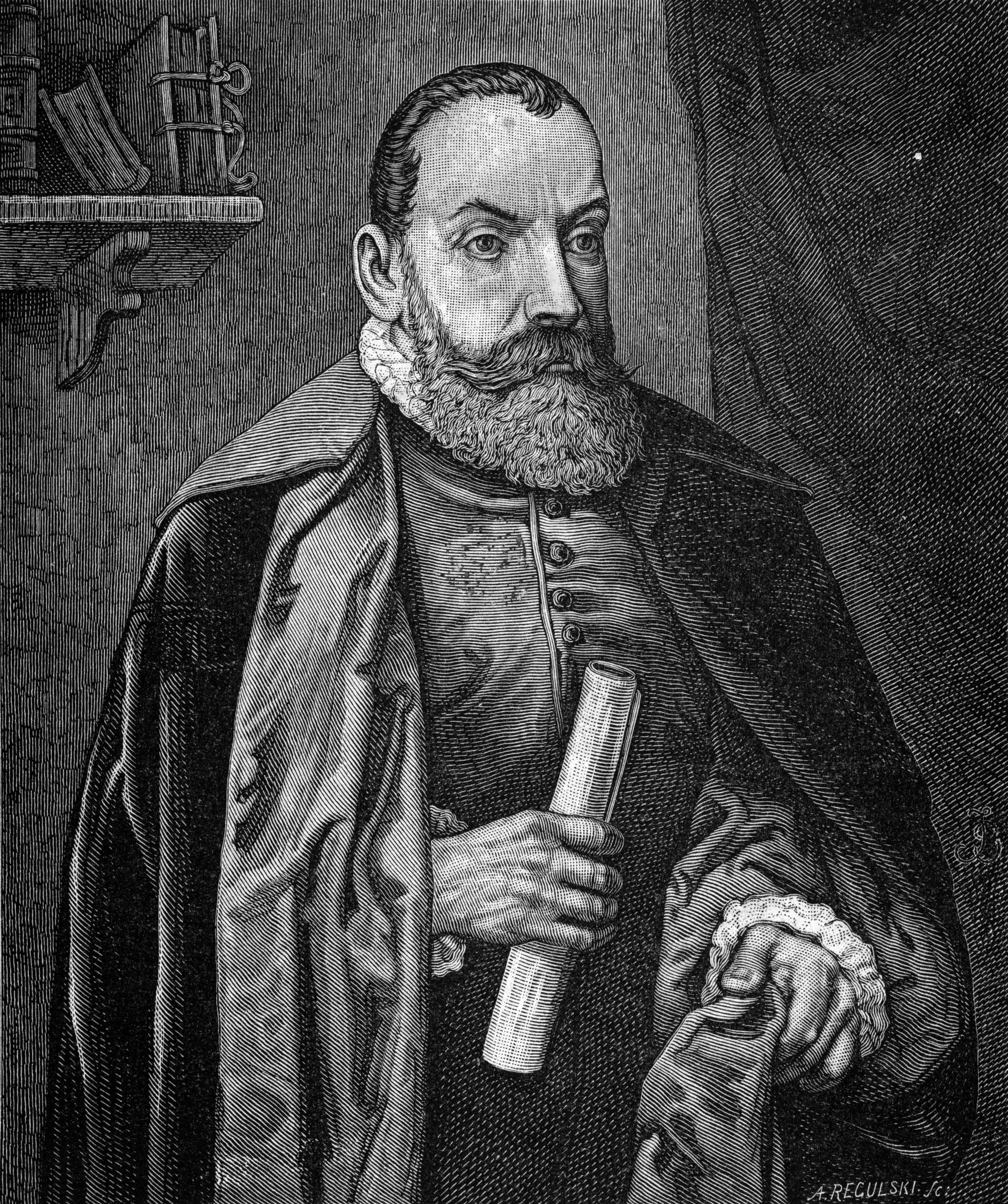
Jan Kochanowski

According to Tadeusz Ulewicz, Kochanowski wrote the play probably ca. 1565–66. However, Czesław Miłosz implies that it was commissioned by Jan Zamoyski for his wedding in the late 1570s.

In any case, it was not published or performed until debuted 12 January 1578 at Zamoyski's wedding to Krystyna Radziwiłł at Ujazdów Castle in Warsaw, before the royal court and King Stephen Báthory. Many of the actors in the premiere were royal courtiers, and the play was directed by prominent physician Wojciech Oczko.

The play was translated into English in 1918 by George Rapall Noyes and Ruth Earl Merrill as The Dismissal of the Grecian Envoys; under the same title in 1994 by Charles S. Kraszewski; in 1999 by Barry Keane as The Dismissal of the Greek Envoys; and in 2007 by Bill Johnston as The Envoys.

== Plot ==
The plot of the play focuses on the arrival of the titular Greek envoys at Troy, in order to prevent the outbreak of hostilities—an event mentioned in Homer's Iliad. The envoys ask for the return of kidnapped Helen. Some statesmen from Troy, led by Antenor, support such an action, but in the end they are overruled by a more vocal faction led by Helen's abductor Paris.

== Analysis ==
This was a blank-verse tragedy of eleven and thirteen syllables. In its structure, it is a typical Renaissance work, inspired by Horace and subsequent French and Italian developments (works of Scaliger). It is divided into five acts, from the exposition to the announcement of the tragedy to the tragedy itself. Events that happen outside the stage are summarized in dialogues, including a vision of Cassandra. It was the first tragedy written in Polish.

Miłosz wrote that the drama is "neither a tragedy of passions nor a tragedy of a reveled fate... the fatal outcome is due not to an inexorable fatality but merely to stupidity and demagoguery." The tragedy depicted is that of characters who understand what is at stake but who cannot stop the wheels of events put in motion, ushering the impending doom (the Trojan War). As such, Miłosz writes, the play has no heroes outside the state of Troy.

The work's main theme are the responsibilities of statesmanship, critique of weak rulers and failings of power, where the voice of "wise and reasonable" is drowned by that of passionate but selfish and poorly educated youth. Edmund Kotarski commented on its universal values such as "the truth about the superiority of the common good and dependence of the country and of its future on its citizens’ stance". The tragedy also connected to the 16th century reality of the Polish-Lithuanian Commonwealth, with the deliberations of Greek statesmen resembling that of Polish Sejm, and the weakness and impotence of King Priam being a commentary on the Commonwealth's constitutional monarchy.

== Reception ==
The play is one of Kochanowski's more important and better known works; already described as well studied by scholars in the mid-1960s. Miłosz called it "the finest specimen of Polish humanist drama". Kotarski in turn wrote that the work "was Poland’s first really poetic and deeply reflective drama, the first and for a hundred years the only one". Despite its significance, it failed to inspire many imitators in Poland, at least not until centuries later (works of Stanisław Wyspiański).

== See also ==
- Theatre of Poland
- Polish literature
