= Andrzej Kochanowski =

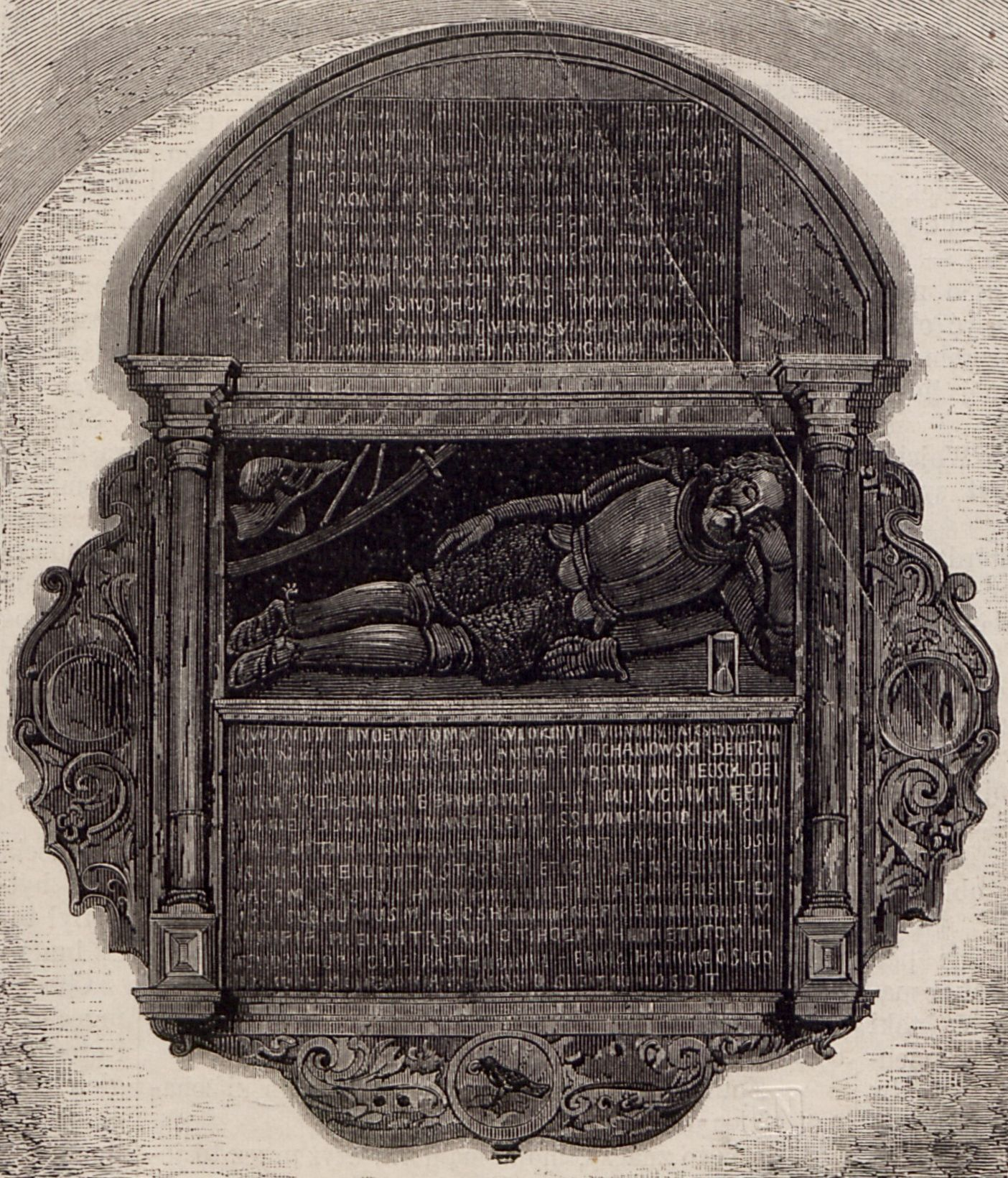
Andrzej Kochanowski, depicted in an engraving of his tombstone

Andrzej Kochanowski (1542–1596) was a Polish nobleman, poet and translator. He was Jan Kochanowski's younger brother and Piotr Kochanowski's paternal uncle. He was the fourth son of Piotr Kochanowski, judge of Sandomierz, and his wife Anna of the Białaczowski-Odrowąż family. He married Zofia Sobieska and became father of (among others) Jan and Samuel.

Jan Zamoyski, the great chancellor of the Kingdom of Poland, was Andrzej Kochanowski's patron and suggested that he translate Virgil's Aeneid. Kochanowski's version of Virgil's epic poem, published in 1590, is among the most important Polish translations of the 16th century. Kochanowski also translated works by Plutarch.
