= Leo Wiener =

American linguist (1862–1939)

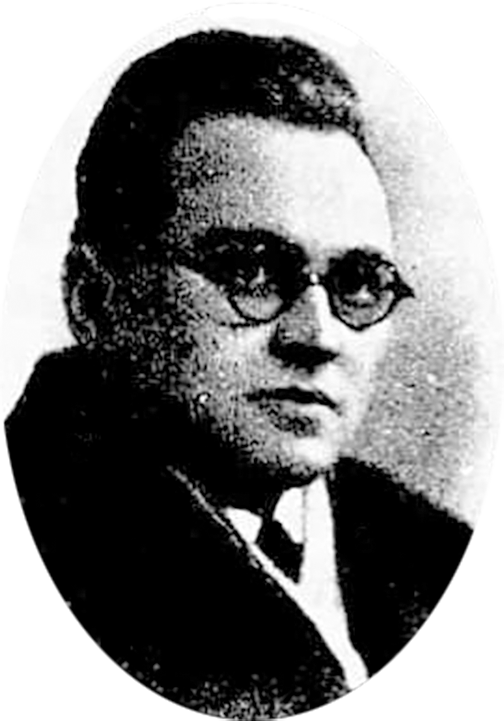
- Born: 27 July 1862; Białystok, Russian Empire
- Died: 13 December 1939 (aged 77); Belmont, Massachusetts, United States
- Citizenship: United States
- Education: University of Warsaw; Friedrich Wilhelm University
- Known for: became the first American professor of Slavic literature; translated 24 volumes of Leo Tolstoy's works into English
- Spouse: Bertha Kahn
- Children: Norbert Wiener (son)
- Scientific career
- Fields: history, linguistics
- Workplaces: University of Kansas (1892–95); Harvard University (1895–1930)
- Notable students: George Rapall Noyes

Leo Wiener (27 July 1862 – 13 December 1939) was an American historian, linguist, author and translator. He is best known for his historical works on slavic languages as well as his works on Yiddish culture. Furthermore, he is well known for his books "The History of Yiddish Literature in the Nineteenth Century" (1889), "Africa and the Discovery of America" (1922), and "Mayan and Mexican Origins" (1926). His complete edition of Tolstoy's works provided a very literal translation of the text from Russian. While his edition holds value, his translations of Tolstoy's most popular novels War and Peace and Anna Karenina were largely overshadowed by Constance Garnett and Aylmer Maude.

== Biography ==
Wiener was born in Białystok (then in the Russian Empire), of Lithuanian Jewish origin. His father was Zalmen (Solomon) Wiener, and his mother was Frejda Rabinowicz. He studied at the University of Warsaw in 1880, and then at the Friedrich Wilhelm University in Berlin. Wiener later declared, "Having 'for many years been a member of the Unitarian Church,' and having 'preached absolute amalgamation with the Gentile surroundings', [I] 'never allied with the Jewish Church or with Jews as such."

Wiener left Europe with the plan of founding a vegetarian commune in British Honduras (now Belize). He sailed steerage to New Orleans. On his arrival, in 1880, he had no money. After travel and work around the US, he went to Kansas City, Missouri, and became a lecturer in the department of Germanic and Romance languages at the University of Kansas. He was a polyglot, and was reputed to speak thirty languages well.

Wiener published articles on Yiddish linguistic elements in Polish, German, Ukrainian, and Belarusian. In 1898, Wiener traveled to Europe to collect material for his book The History of Yiddish Literature in the Nineteenth Century (1899). Isaac Peretz encouraged him and Abraham Harkavy, librarian at the Asiatic Museum of St. Petersburg, presented him with a thousand Yiddish books, which formed the basis of the Yiddish collection of the Harvard University library. After this project Wiener's interest in Yiddish declined.

Beginning in 1896, Wiener lectured on Slavic cultures at Harvard University and became the first American professor of Slavic literature. He compiled a valuable anthology of Russian literature and translated 24 volumes of Lev Tolstoy's works into English, a task which he completed in 24 months, including a biography of Tolstoy in the final volume He taught George Rapall Noyes.

== Major works ==
- Leo Wiener (1893). French Words in Wolfram Von Eschenbach.
- Leo Wiener (1898). Popular Poetry of the Russian Jews.
- Leo Wiener (1899). The History of Yiddish Literature in the Nineteenth Century.
- Leo Wiener (1900). The Ferrara Bible.
- Leo Wiener (1902–1903). Anthology of Russian Literature from the Earliest Period to the Present Time.
- Leo Wiener (1905). Lev N. Tolstoy: An Analysis of His Life and Works.
- Leo Wiener (1909). Gypsies as Fortune-Tellers and as Blacksmiths.
- Leo Wiener (1914). Philological Fallacies: One in Romance, Another in Germanic.
- Leo Wiener (1915). Commentary to the Germanic laws and mediaeval documents.
- Leo Wiener (1915). An Interpretation of the Russian People.
- Josef Svatopluk Machar (1916). Magdalen. Translated by Leo Wiener.
- Leo Wiener (1917–1921). Contributions Toward a History of Arabico-Gothic Culture.
- Leo Wiener (1922). Africa and the Discovery of America. Vol. I–III.
- Leo Wiener (1924). The Contemporary Drama of Russia.
- Leo Wiener (1925). The Philological History of "Tobacco" in America.
- Leo Wiener (1926). Mayan and Mexican Origins.

== Family ==
In 1893 Wiener married Bertha Kahn. The mathematician Norbert Wiener was their son. Though he himself was a prodigy, he believed in nurture and became dedicated to turn his son into a genius. Norbert Wiener graduated from Ayer High School in 1906 at 11 years of age, and then entered Tufts College. He was awarded a BA in mathematics in 1909 at the age of 14, whereupon he began graduate studies of zoology at Harvard. In 1910 he transferred to Cornell to study philosophy. He graduated in 1911 at the age of 17.
