= Piotr Kochanowski =

Polish nobleman and writer (1566–1620)

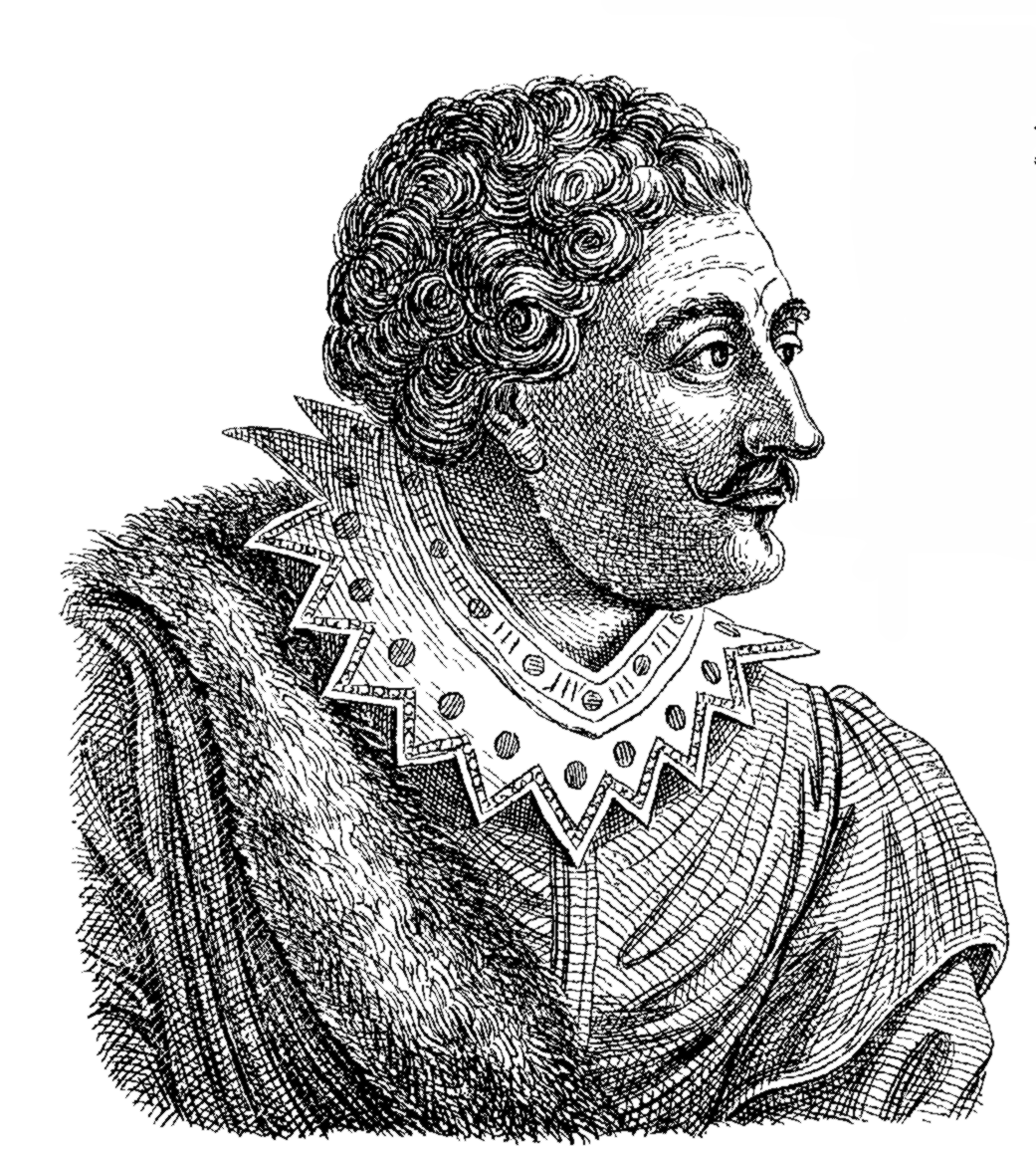
- Piotr Kochanowski
- Born: 1566
- Died: 1620 (aged 53–54)
- Occupations: nobleman, poet and translator

Piotr Kochanowski (1566–1620) was a Polish nobleman, poet and translator. He belonged to a family of writers. He was a son of Mikołaj Kochanowski and a nephew of Jan Kochanowski. He was born in 1566 in Sycyna. He is famous for his translations from Italian. He translated into Polish what were generally esteemed to be the two greatest modern epic poems: Ludovico Ariosto's Orlando furioso (Roland Enraged) and Torquato Tasso's Gerusalemme liberata (Jerusalem Delivered). His version of Tasso's poem served as the Polish national epic. Piotr Kochanowski was the second poet in Poland (after Sebastian Grabowiecki) to use ottava rima, which became very popular in Baroque Polish poetry. He died on 2 August 1620 and was buried at the Franciscan church in Kraków. He is commonly regarded as one of the most important Polish writers of the Renaissance.
