= David's Psalter =

Polish translation of the Book of Psalms

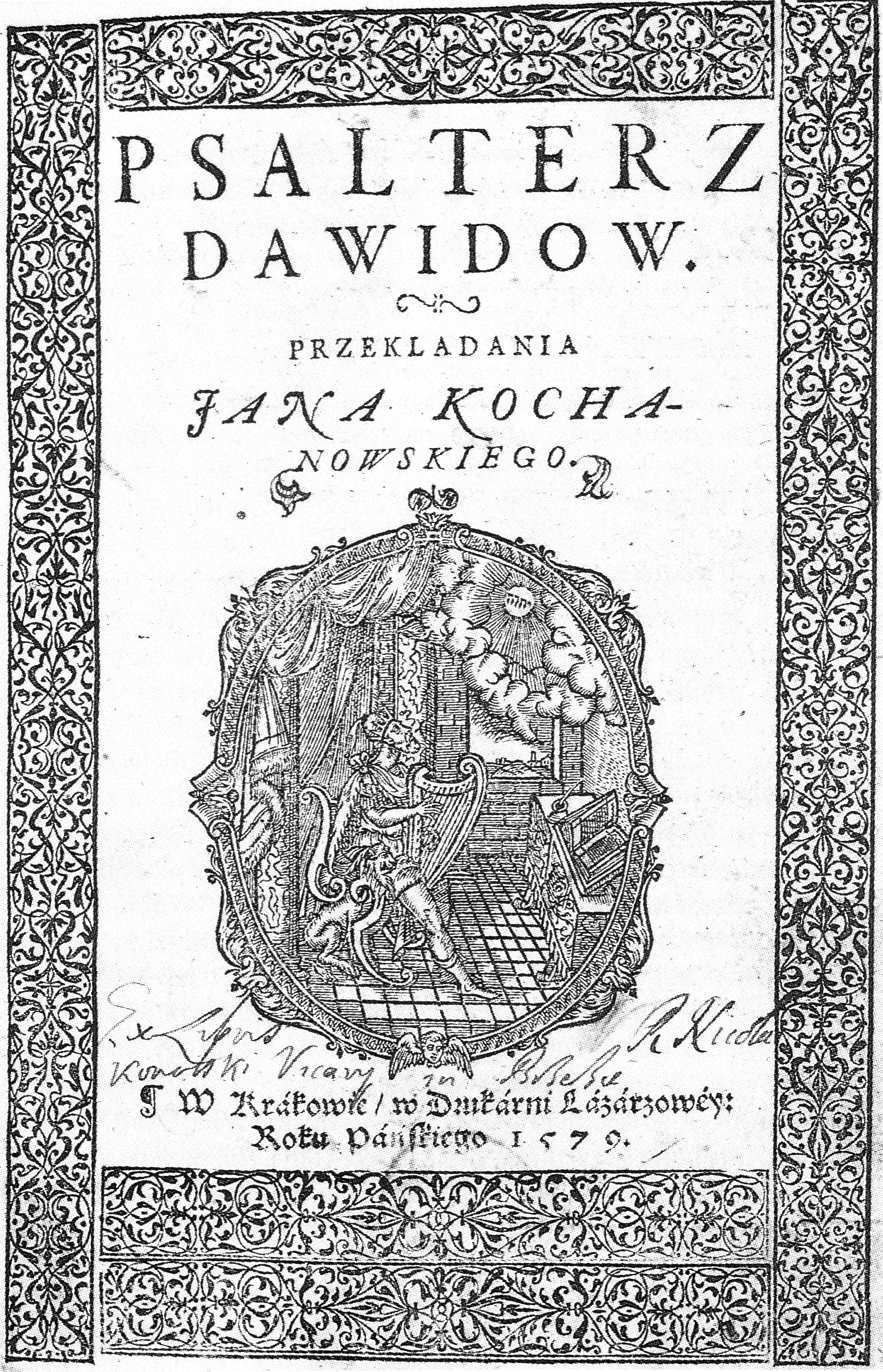
Title page of David's Psalter

David's Psalter (original Polish title: Psalterz Dawidow) is a poetic translation into Polish of the Book of Psalms, by Jan Kochanowski, the most prominent poet of the Polish Renaissance. It was printed in 1579 in Kraków, at the Lazarus printing house.

Kochanowski, like contemporaries in Western Europe, used a Latin translation of the Book of Psalms as the basis for his translation. Well versed in the ancient classics, he combined the original's biblical spirit with the literary achievements of Greek and Latin authors.

Kochanowski's David's Psalter won recognition from both Protestants and Catholics in Poland, and also resonated abroad, notably in the work of Moldavian Metropolitan Dosoftei. Some of Kochanowski's renderings of the Psalms are still used in Polish Catholic masses.

By the mid-18th century alone, it had gone through at least 25 editions and, set to music, became an enduring element of Polish church masses and folklore. It also became one of his more influential works on the international scene, translated into Russian by Symeon of Polotsk and into, among other languages, Romanian, German, Lithuanian, Czech, and Slovak.

Norman Davies wrote that "Kochanowski's Psalter did for Polish what Luther's Bible did for German".

David's Psalter was Kochanowski's first published collection of poems (in 1579).
