= Sycyna Północna =

- Village
- Location within Poland
- Coordinates: 51°19′N 21°37′E
- Country: Poland
- Voivodeship: Masovian
- County: Zwoleń
- Gmina: Zwoleń
- Population: 1,000

Sycyna Północna [sɨˈt͡sɨna puu̯ˈnɔt͡sna] is a village in Poland's present-day Mazowsze Province (Zwoleń County). In 1975–98, it was part of Radom Province.

The first recorded mention of Sycyna (as "Szyczyny") comes from 1191. Its first known owner was Mikołaj (Nicholas) de Szycina (1418). In 1470 the village was described by the chronicler, Jan Długosz. From 1525 Sycyna belonged to the Kochanowski family, having been purchased by the szlachcic (nobleman) Piotr Kochanowski. Five years later, in 1530, at Sycyna the poet Jan Kochanowski was born. Sycyna was divided into Sycyna Północna ("North") and Sycyna Południowa ("South") in the 21st century.

== Massacre during Second World War ==
During the German Invasion of Poland in 1939, German forces on 10 September murdered 11 Poles. The victims were buried in mass graves.
