= Hans Dürer =

German painter (1490–1538)

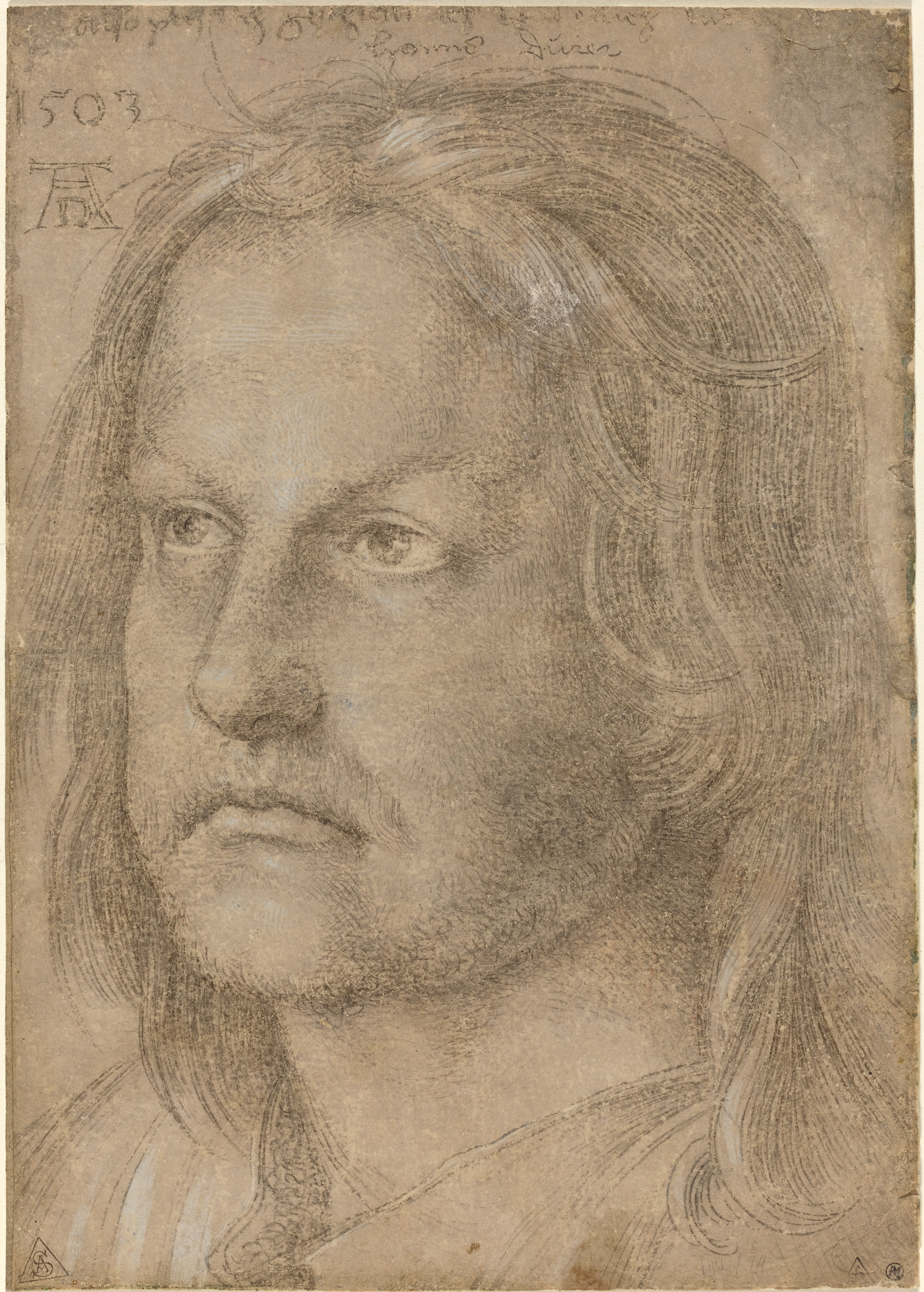
- Portrait of Hans Dürer by Albrecht Dürer
- Born: Johann Dürer; 21 February 1490; Nuremberg
- Died: c. 1534-38; Kraków
- Known for: Painting, Engraving
- Movement: Northern Renaissance
- Parents: Albrecht Dürer the Elder (father); Barbara Dürer (mother)
- Relatives: Albrecht Dürer (brother)

Hans Dürer (born 21 February 1490 in Nuremberg – c. 1534-38 in Kraków), was a German Renaissance painter, illustrator, and engraver.

== Life ==
Hans Dürer was born in Nuremberg, Germany in 1490. He was the son of Albrecht Dürer the Elder and the younger brother of Albrecht Dürer. Hans Dürer was previously a mine laborer as a result of losing a coin toss and agreeing to a pact to his brother, Albrecht Dürer. The pact was that the brother who lost the pact would financially help the winning brother's art academy fees for 4 years. Then the losing brother would then pursue art while the graduated brother would financially support the other brother. Hans lost this toss. Then while it was his turn, he couldn't go to art academy as his hand was too damaged and in bad condition after working in the mines. After a few years Hans' hand cured and became an artist. Albrecht painted an art piece, "Betende Hände" which was Hans' hands painted in a praying position as a tribute to his brother's sacrifice. He was a pupil of his older brother, and also worked in the workshop of Michael Wolgemut in his youth. Hans Dürer was last known to have lived in Nuremberg in 1510. At some point he settled in Kraków, Poland. He was one of the artists hired by King Sigismund I to decorate the rooms of Wawel Castle, and in 1529 he was appointed court painter. His death is recorded as having occurred in 1534, however there is a record of payment for work at the royal castle the following year.

== Gallery ==
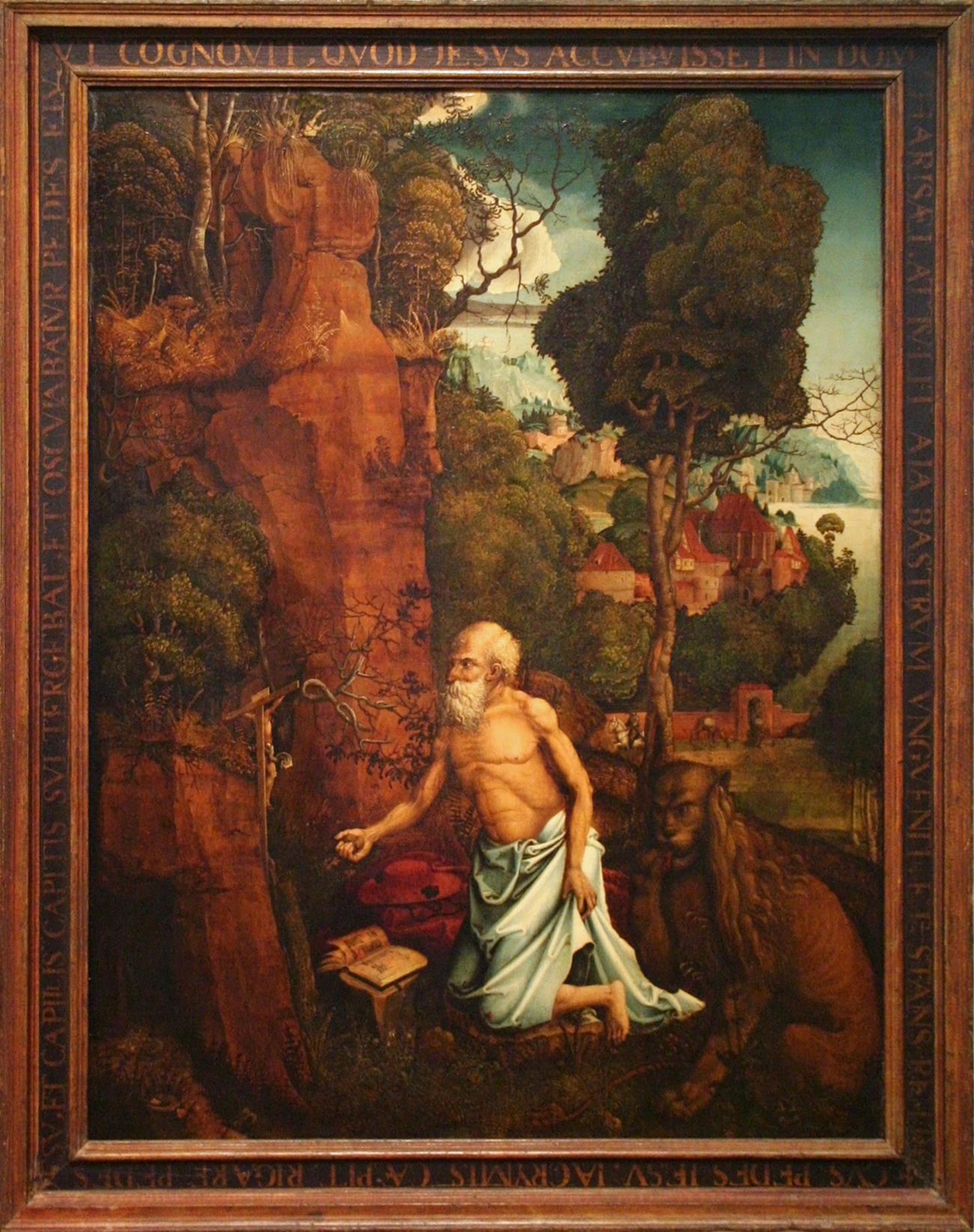
The Penitent St. Jerome in a Landscape by Hans Dürer, National Gallery in Prague
