= Władysław Mikos =

Polish painter

Władysław Mikos (19 November 1885 – 3 November 1970) was a Polish painter.

Mikos was born in Brzóza, Poland under Russian occupation. He was a graduate of Jan Matejko Academy of Fine Arts and student of Jacek Malczewski, Teodor Axentowicz and Leon Wyczółkowski. He is famous as a dedicated South Mazovia region painter and achieved many awards for his works and became famous in Poland in the mid-wars period. He died in Radom, Poland, where one of its streets now bears his name.

Mikos' art was exhibited at the Zachęta – National Gallery of Art prior to the outbreak of World War II.
