= Michael J. Mikos =

American linguist

Michael J. Mikos is a professor of foreign languages and literature at the University of Wisconsin–Milwaukee.

He specializes in Polish language, literature, and culture.

He is also a translator and has rendered many works of Polish literature into English.

== Selected publications ==
- Adam Mickiewicz. The Sun of Liberty. Warsaw: Energeia, 1998.
- Polish Literature from the Middle Ages to the End of the Eighteenth Century. A Bilingual Anthology. Warsaw: Constans, 1999.
- Juliusz Slowacki. This Fateful Power. Lublin: Norbertinum, 1999.
- The Virgin Mary's Crown. A Bilingual Anthology of Medieval Polish Marian Poetry. Cracow: Collegium Columbinum, 2002 (with Roman Mazurkiewicz).
- Polish Romantic Literature. An Anthology. Bloomington: Slavica, 2002.
- Polish Literature from 1864 to 1918. An Anthology. Bloomington: Slavica, 2006.
- Occasional Poems. Bloomington: Slavica, 2023.

=== Translation ===
- Wencel, Wojciech Imago Mundo and Other Poems. Slavica, 2023.
