= Renaissance in Poland =

The Renaissance in Poland (Polish: Renesans, Odrodzenie [rɛˈnɛ.sans], [ɔd.rɔˈd͡zɛ.ɲɛ]; lit. 'the Rebirth') lasted from the late 15th to the late 16th century and is widely considered to have been the Golden Age of Polish culture. Ruled by the Jagiellonian dynasty, the Crown of the Kingdom of Poland (from 1569 part of the Polish–Lithuanian Commonwealth) actively participated in the broad European Renaissance. The multinational Polish state experienced a period of cultural growth thanks in part to a century without major wars, aside from conflicts in the sparsely populated eastern and southern borderlands. The Reformation spread peacefully throughout the country (giving rise to the Polish Brethren), and living conditions improved, cities grew, and exports of agricultural products enriched the population, especially the nobility (szlachta), who gained dominance in the new political system of Golden Liberty.

== Overview ==
The Renaissance movement, whose influence originated in Italy, spread throughout Poland roughly in the 15th and 16th century. Many Italian artists arrived in the country welcomed by Polish royalty, including Francesco Fiorentino, Bartolomeo Berecci, Santi Gucci, Mateo Gucci, Bernardo Morando, Giovanni Battista di Quadro and others, including thinkers and educators such as Filip Callimachus, merchants such as the Boner family and the Montelupi family, and other prominent personalities who immigrated to Poland since the late 15th century in search of new opportunities. Most of them settled in Kraków, the Polish capital until 1611.

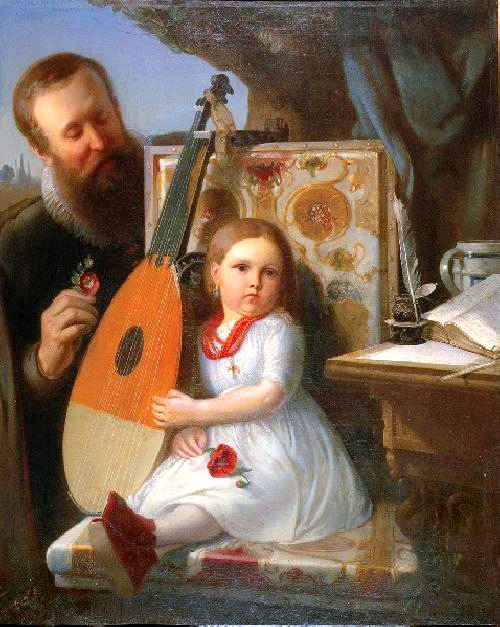
Jan Kochanowski, poet and prose writer, with his beloved daughter

The Renaissance values of the dignity of man and power of his reason were applauded in Poland. Many works were translated into Polish and Latin from classical Latin, Greek and Hebrew, as well as contemporary languages like Italian. The Cracow Academy, one of the world's oldest universities, enjoyed its Golden Era between 1500 and 1535, with 3,215 students graduating in the first decade of the 16th century – a record not surpassed until the late 18th century. The period of Polish Renaissance, supportive of intellectual pursuits, produced many outstanding artists and scientists. Among them were Nicolaus Copernicus who in his De revolutionibus orbium coelestium presented the heliocentric theory of the universe, Maciej of Miechów, author of Tractatus de duabus Sarmatis... – the most accurate up to date geographical and ethnographical account of Eastern Europe; Bernard Wapowski, a cartographer whose maps of that region appeared in Ptolemy's Geography; Marcin Kromer who in his De origine et rebus gestis Polonorum libri... described both the history and geography of Poland; Andrzej Frycz Modrzewski, a philosopher concerned with governance; Mikołaj Rej who has popularized the use of Polish in poetry; and Jan Kochanowski, whose poems in Polish elevated him to the ranks of the most prominent Polish poets.

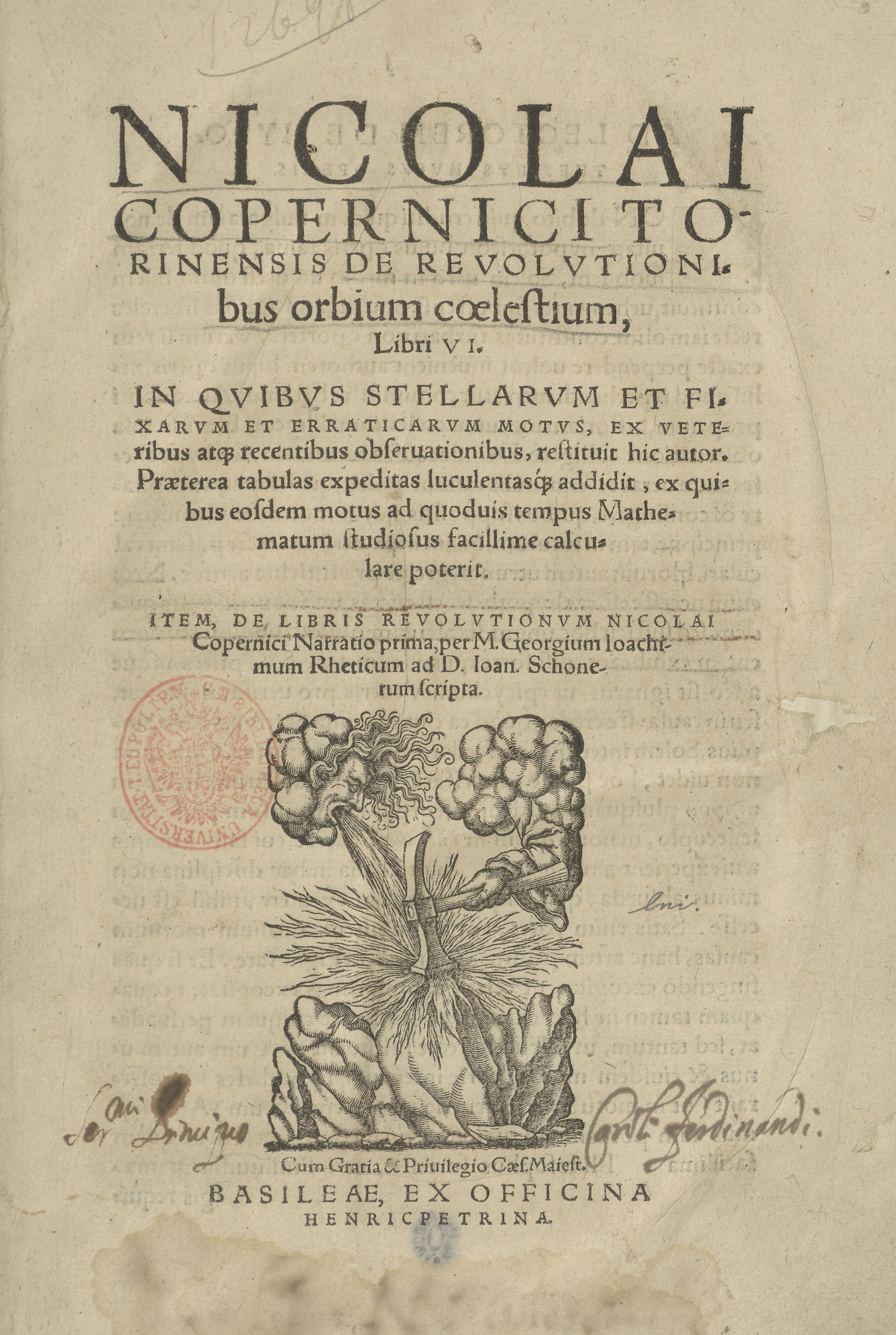
Copernicus' De revolutionibus orbium coelestium

Young Poles, especially sons of nobility (szlachta), who graduated from any one of over 2,500 parish schools, gymnasiums and several academies (Cracow Academy, Wilno Academy, Zamość Academy), often traveled abroad to complete their education. Polish thinkers, like Andrzej Frycz Modrzewski, Johannes Dantiscus or Jan Łaski maintained contacts with leading European philosophers of the Renaissance, such as Thomas More, Erasmus and Philip Melanchthon. Poland not only partook in the exchange of major cultural and scientific ideas and developments of Western Europe, but also spread Western heritage eastwards among East Slavic nations. For example, printing process, Latin and art with the syllabic versification in poetry, especially in Belarus and Ukraine (through Kyiv-Mohyla Academy), from where it was transmitted to Russia (Duchy of Moscow), which began to increase its ties with western Europe in the aftermath of the Mongol invasion of Rus. The first four printed Cyrillic books in the world were published in Kraków, in 1491, by printer Szwajpolt Fiol.

== Art ==
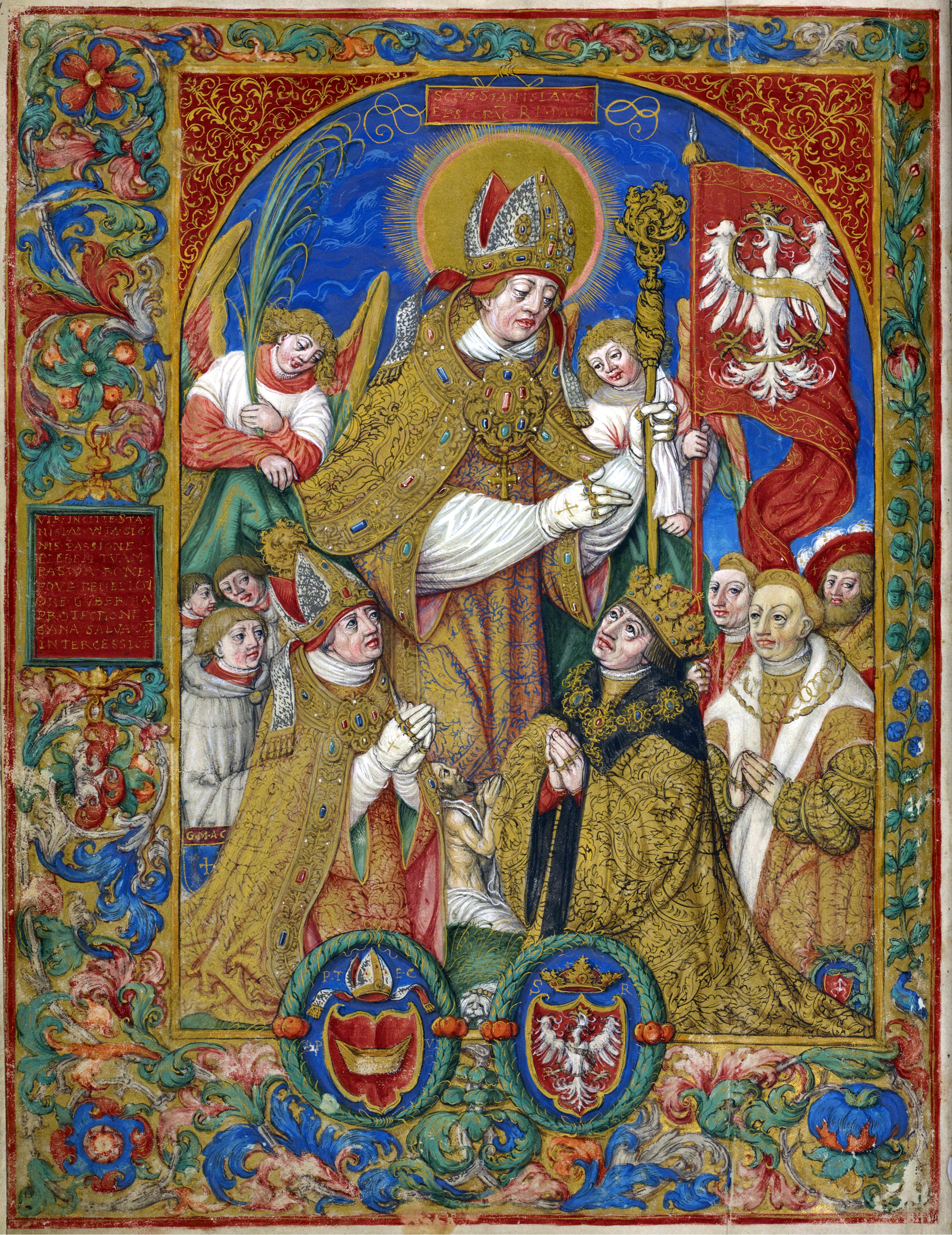
King Sigismund I the Old and bishop Piotr Tomicki kneeling before St. Stanislaus, a leaf from the Hours of Sigismund I by Stanisław Samostrzelnik, 1535

Incentives for development of art and architecture were many. King Sigismund I the Old, who ascended to the throne in 1507, was a sponsor of many artists, and began a major project – under Florence architect Bartolommeo Berrecci – of remaking the ancient residence of the Polish kings, the Wawel Castle, into a modern Renaissance residence. Sigismund's zeal for Renaissance was matched not only by his son, Sigismund II Augustus, but by many wealthy nobles and burghers who also desired to display their wealth, influence and cultural savvy. In 1578, chancellor Jan Zamoyski begun construction of the ideal Renaissance city, sponsoring the creation of Zamość (a city named after him), which soon became an important administrative, commercial and educational town of Renaissance Poland. The two largest contemporary Polish cities – Kraków (which attracted many Italian architects) and Gdańsk (which attracted mostly architects from Germany and the Netherlands) – likely gained the most in the era, but many other cities also spotted new Renaissance constructions.

Renaissance painting was introduced in Poland by many immigrant artists, such as Lucas Cranach, Hans Dürer and Hans von Kulmbach, and practiced by such Polish painters as Marcin Kober (a court painter of king Stefan Batory). The works of the portraitists created an impressive gallery, particularly representative of those who could afford to be immortalized in them.

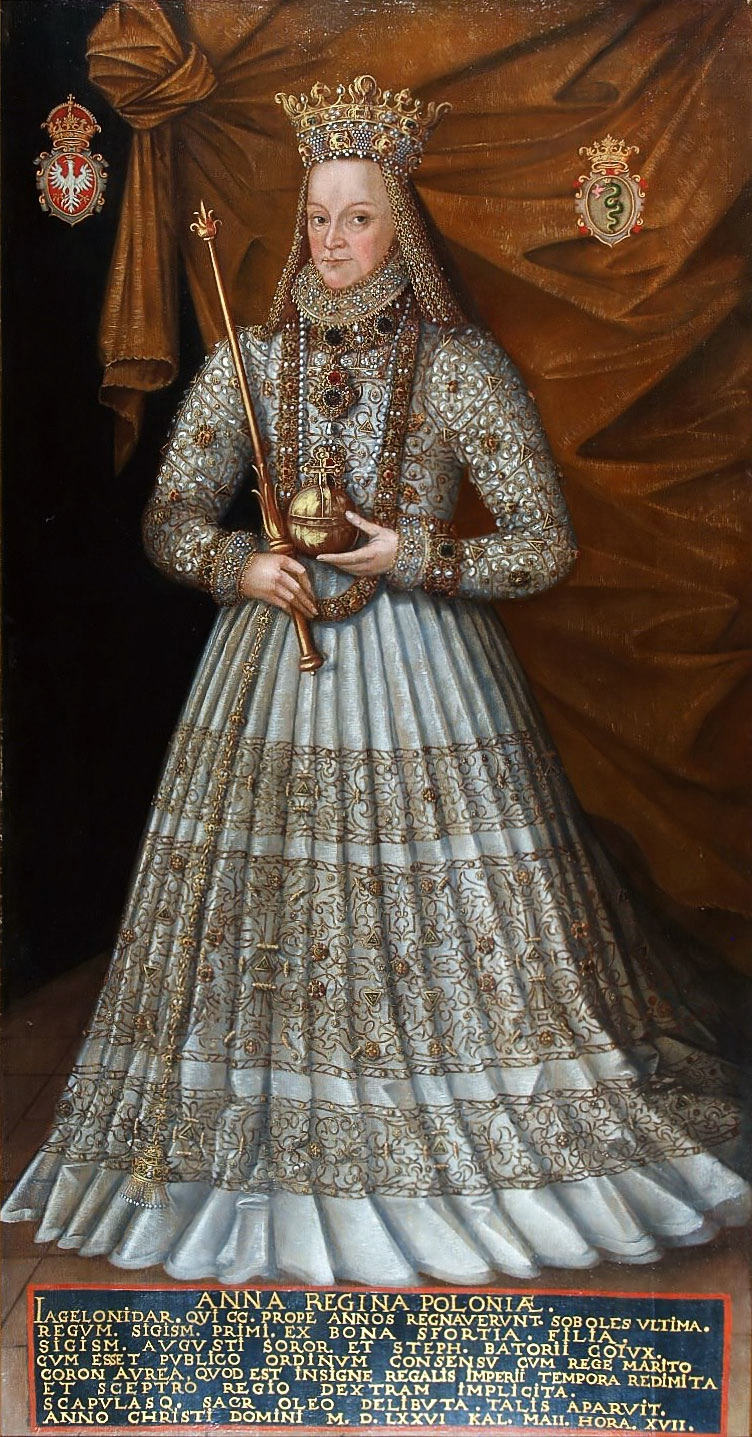
Portrait of Queen Anna Jagiellon of Poland by Martin Kober, 1576

The centre of musical culture was the royal residence at Kraków, where the royal court welcomed many foreign and local performers. The most significant works of the Renaissance in Poland include compositions, usually for lute and organs, both vocal and instrumental, from dances, through polyphonic music, to religious oratorios and masses. In 1540 by Jan of Lublin released the Tablature, in which he collected most known European organ pieces. Nicolaus Cracoviensis (Mikołaj of Kraków) composed many masses, motets, songs, dances and preludes. Mikołaj Gomółka was the author of musical rendition of Kochanowski's poems (Melodies for the Polish Psalter). The most famous Polish composer was Wacław z Szamotuł, recognized as one of the outstanding Renaissance composers.

=== Notable Polish Renaissance artists ===
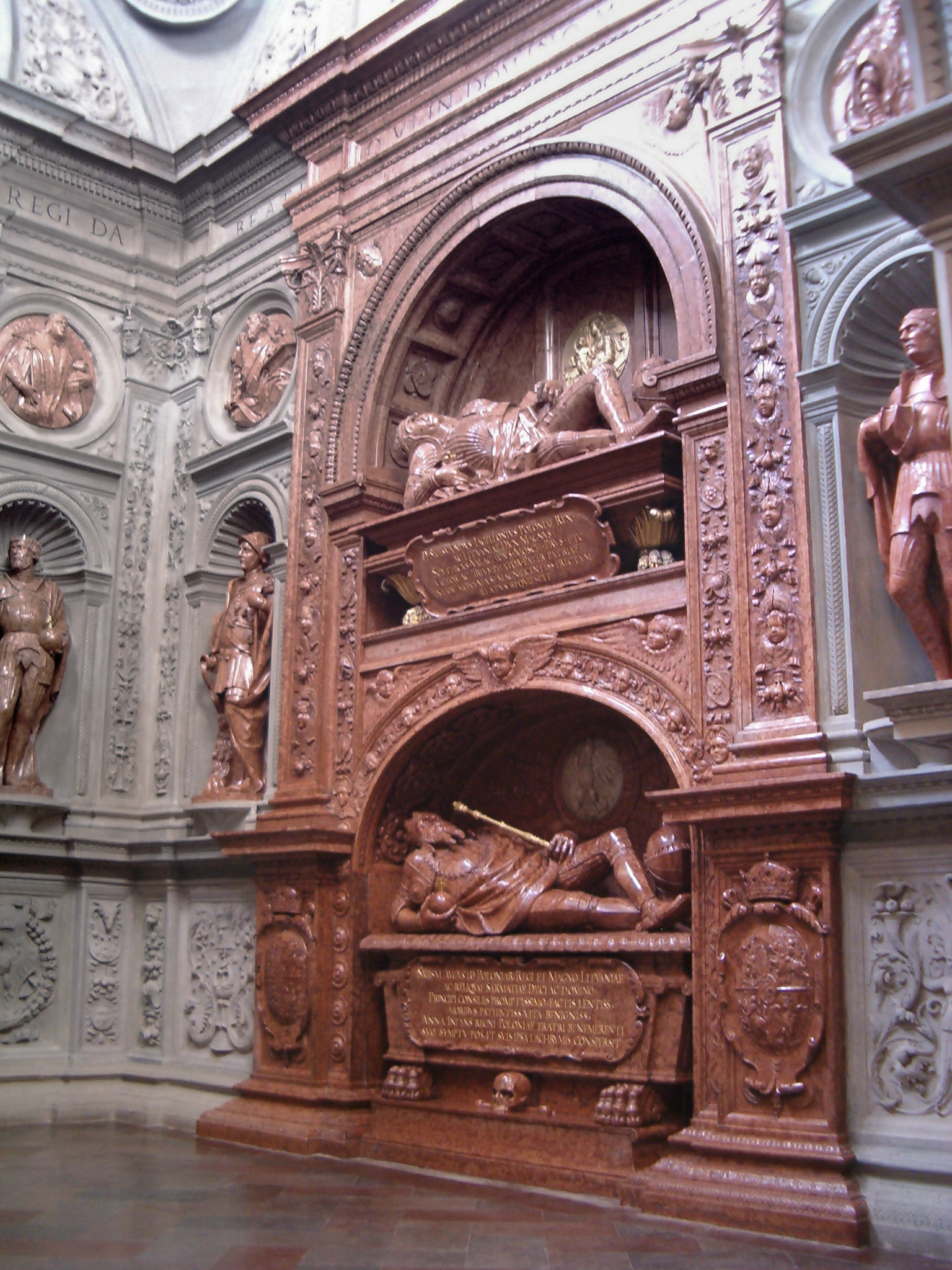
Graves of the last Jagiellons in the Sigismund's Chapel, hailed as "the most beautiful example of the Tuscan Renaissance north of the Alps"

Among the most prominent Polish Renaissance writers and artists, whose accomplishments have become a salient part of Polish curriculum are poets Mikołaj Rej, Jan Kochanowski, Szymon Szymonowic, Mikołaj Sęp Szarzyński, Andrzej Krzycki and Johannes Dantiscus, writer Łukasz Górnicki, composer Wacław z Szamotuł, composer and singer Mikołaj Gomółka, sculptor Jan Michałowicz z Urzędowa and painters Stanisław Samostrzelnik and Marcin Kober. The artists and architects who settled into Poland and had achieved considerable recognition for their work in the country are: Hans Dürer, Hans (Süss) von Kulmbach, Mateo Gucci, Santi Gucci, Bartolomeo Berecci, Bernardo Morando, Giovanni Battista di Quadro and others.

== Literature ==
The first printing press was set up in Kraków in 1473 by the German printer Kasper Straube of Bavaria. Between 1561 and 1600, seventeen printing houses in Poland published over 120 titles a year, with an average edition of 500 copies. The first complete translation of the Bible into Polish was made in 1561 by Jan Leopolita (Leopolita's Bible). About that time, the first Polish orthographic dictionary was published (by Stanisław Murzynowski, 1551); grammars and dictionaries also proliferated. The Polish Renaissance was bilingual, the szlachta's speech being a mixture of Polish and Latin, and various authors oscillating among Polish, Latin, and a mixture of the two (macaronic language).

Literature progressed beyond being dominated by religious themes. They were still present, as seen in numerous bible translations, the most famous being the Wujek's Bible by Jakub Wujek, published in 1599. The nobility, however, cared about more than just religious themes, and the works of Polish renaissance reflected their material and spiritual values (see sarmatism). Contemporary poetry extolled the virtue of manorial life. For example, Rej celebrated life and the position of country's noble, while Kochanowski wrote about the pleasures and beauty of life in the countryside, surrounded by nature. Literary forms varied, from ode, pastorals and sonnets to elegy, satire and romance.

== Science and technology ==
Scientific scholars of the period include Jan Łaski (John Lasco), evangelical reformer, Maciej of Miechów (Maciej Miechowita), writer and university teacher, Nicolaus Copernicus, astronomer known in Polish as Mikołaj Kopernik, Wawrzyniec Grzymała Goślicki (Laurentius Grimaldius Gosliscius), political thinker and philosopher; Marcin Kromer, writer and geographer; Andrzej Frycz Modrzewski, writer and philosopher; Piotr Skarga, Jesuit political reformer; Józef Struś, doctor, scientist, mayor of Poznań; and many others.

== Architectural trends and periods ==
Polish Renaissance architecture is divided into three main periods. The first period (1500–1550) is often called "Italian", because most of the Renaissance buildings in this time were built by Italian architects invited by Polish nobility mainly from Florence. During the second period (1550–1600), Renaissance style became common, and included influences from Dutch version of the Renaissance as well as beginnings of the Mannerist style. In the third period (1600–1650), Mannerism became popular, with first notable examples of Baroque (see also, Baroque in Poland).

=== First period ===
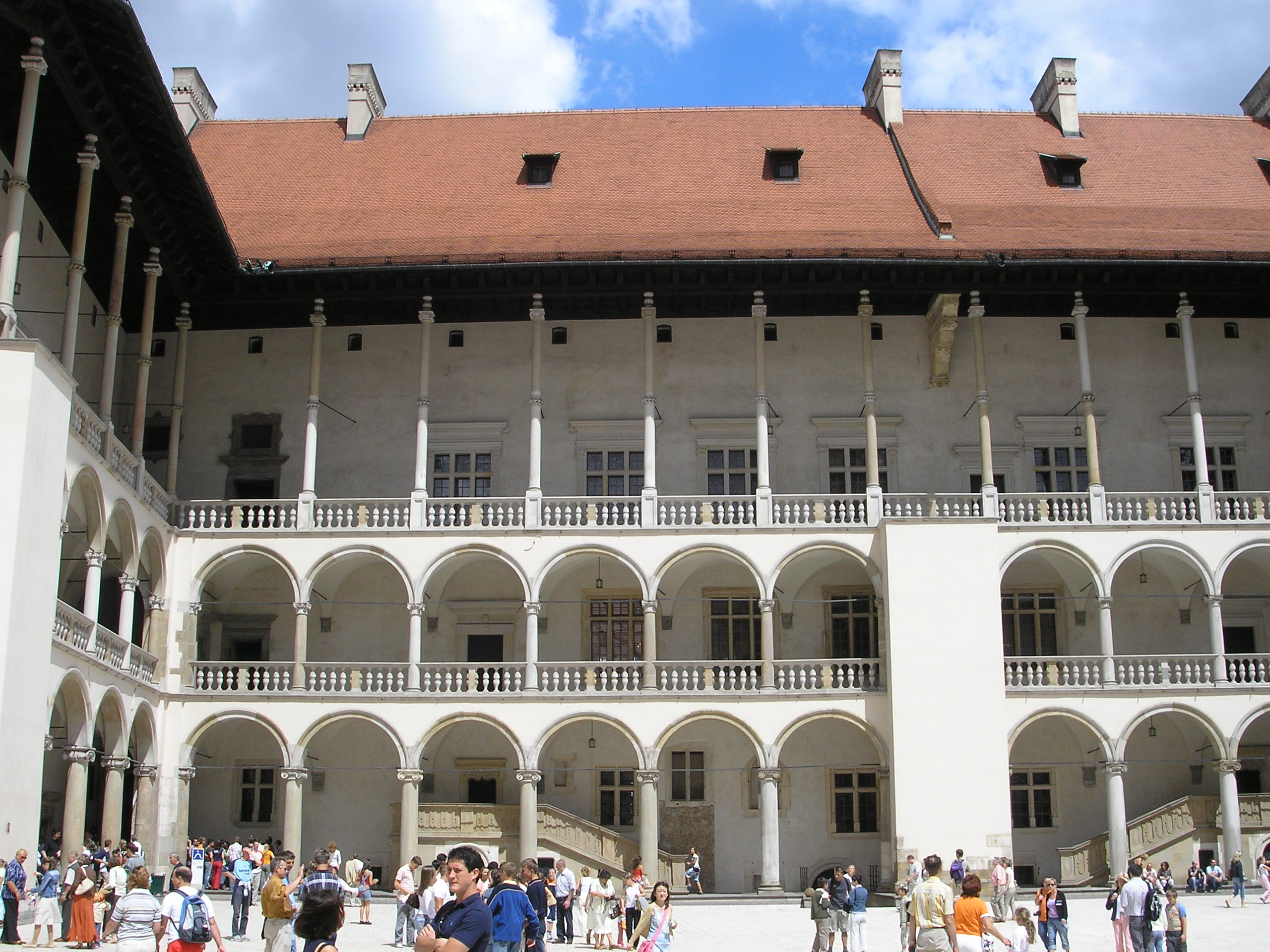
Wawel Castle's courtyard exemplifies first period of the Polish Renaissance

In 1499 Wawel Castle was partially consumed by fire. King Alexander Jagiellon in 1504 appointed Eberhard Rosemberger as the main architect for the renovation. Later, he was replaced by Italian-born Francesco Florentino and, after his death, by Bartolomeo Berrecci and by Benedykt of Sandomierz. As a result of their work the Royal Castle was transformed into a Renaissance residence in Florentine style. In the same period other castles and residences were built or rebuilt in the new style, including Drzewica (built in 1527–1535), Szydłowiec (rebuilt 1509–1532), Ogrodzieniec (rebuilt 1532–1547) and most notably, Pieskowa Skała, rebuilt 1542–1580.

In the first period of the Polish Renaissance, churches were still build mostly in the Gothic style. In this time, only new chapels surrounding the old churches were sometimes built in the new style. The most prominent of them, the Sigismund's Chapel at the Wawel Cathedral, was built in 1519–33 by Bartolomeo Berecci.

=== Second period ===
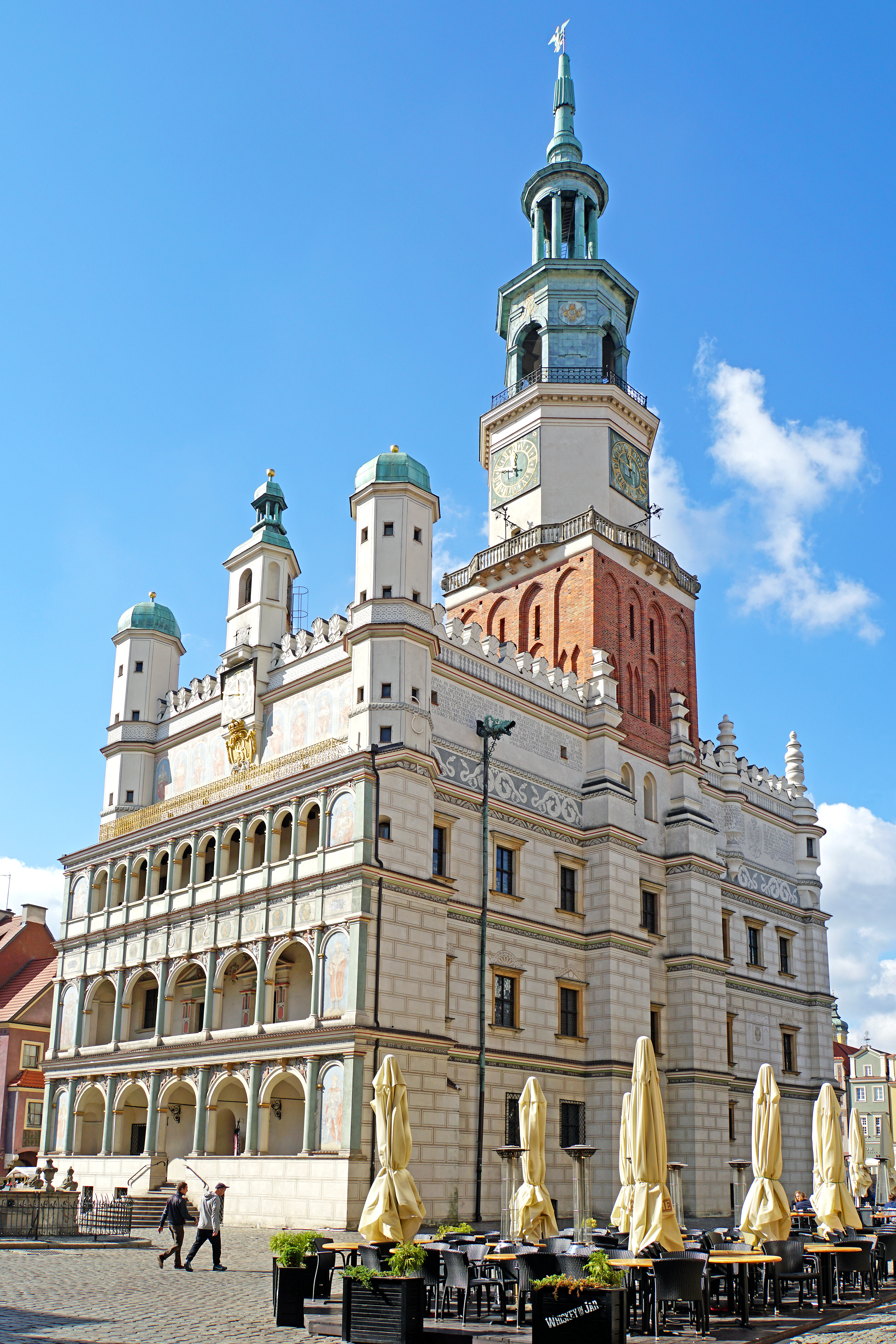
Poznań Town Hall, rebuilt from Gothic style by Giovanni Battista di Quadro, 1550–55

The Renaissance style became most common throughout Poland in its second period. In the northern part of the country, especially in Pomerania and in Gdańsk, there worked a large group of Dutch-born artists. Renaissance style in other parts of Poland varied under local conditions, producing different substyles in each region. Also, some elements of the new Mannerist style were present. Architecture of this period is divided into three regional substyles: "Italian" – mostly in the southern part of Poland, with the most famous artist there being Santi Gucci, the "Dutch" – mostly in Pomerania, and the "Kalisz–Lublin style" (Polish: styl kalisko-lubelski) (or the "Lublin Renaissance") in central Poland – with most notable examples built in Kalisz, Lublin, and Kazimierz Dolny.

All over Poland, new castles were constructed, bearing the new quadrilateral shape enclosing a courtyard, with four towers at the corners. Prominent examples include: the castle at Płakowice (16th century), the castle at Brzeg, (rebuilt from a Gothic stronghold in 1544–60), the castle at Niepołomice (rebuilt after a fire in 1550–71), the castle at Baranów Sandomierski (built in 1591–1606 by Santi Gucci), and the castle at Krasiczyn.

Many cities erected new buildings in the Renaissance style. New Cloth Hall (Sukiennice) in Kraków was built. City halls were built or rebuilt in: Tarnów, Sandomierz, Chełm (demolished) and in Poznań. Also, entire towns were often redesigned. Examples of Renaissance urban planning survived into modern times in Szydłowiec and Zamość.

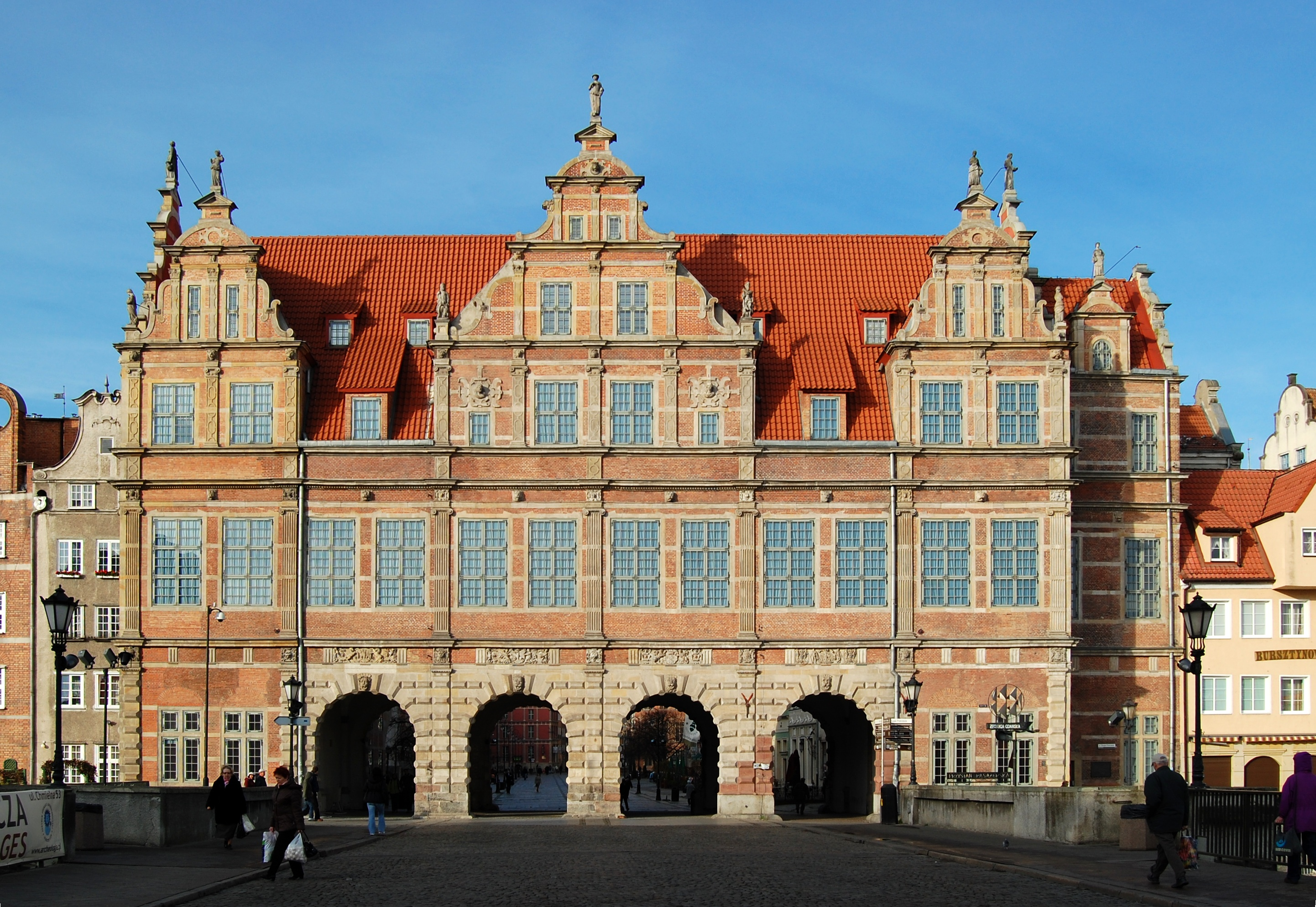
Green Gate in Gdańsk

Examples of Pomeranian Renaissance which developed under the influence of Northern Europe rather than Italy were: Green Gate in Gdańsk (built in 1564–1568 by Hans Kramer), Upland Gate in Gdańsk (finished by Willem van den Blocke in 1588), Great Arsenal in Gdańsk (built in 1602–1606 by Anthonis van Obbergen), and the Old City Hall in Gdańsk (built in 1587–1595, probably by Anthonis van Obbergen).

Characteristic laicization of life during Renaissance and Reformation resulted in only minor development in sacral architecture. Mainly chapels were being built in the Renaissance style, but some churches were also rebuilt including: Cathedral in Płock (rebuilt after fire by architects Bernardino de Gianotis, Cini, Filippo di Fiesole and later again by Giovanni Battista di Quadro); and, the Collegiate in Pułtusk (rebuilt by John Batista of Venice). Only a few new churches were founded, such as the collegiate church of St. Thomas in Zamość.

=== Third period ===
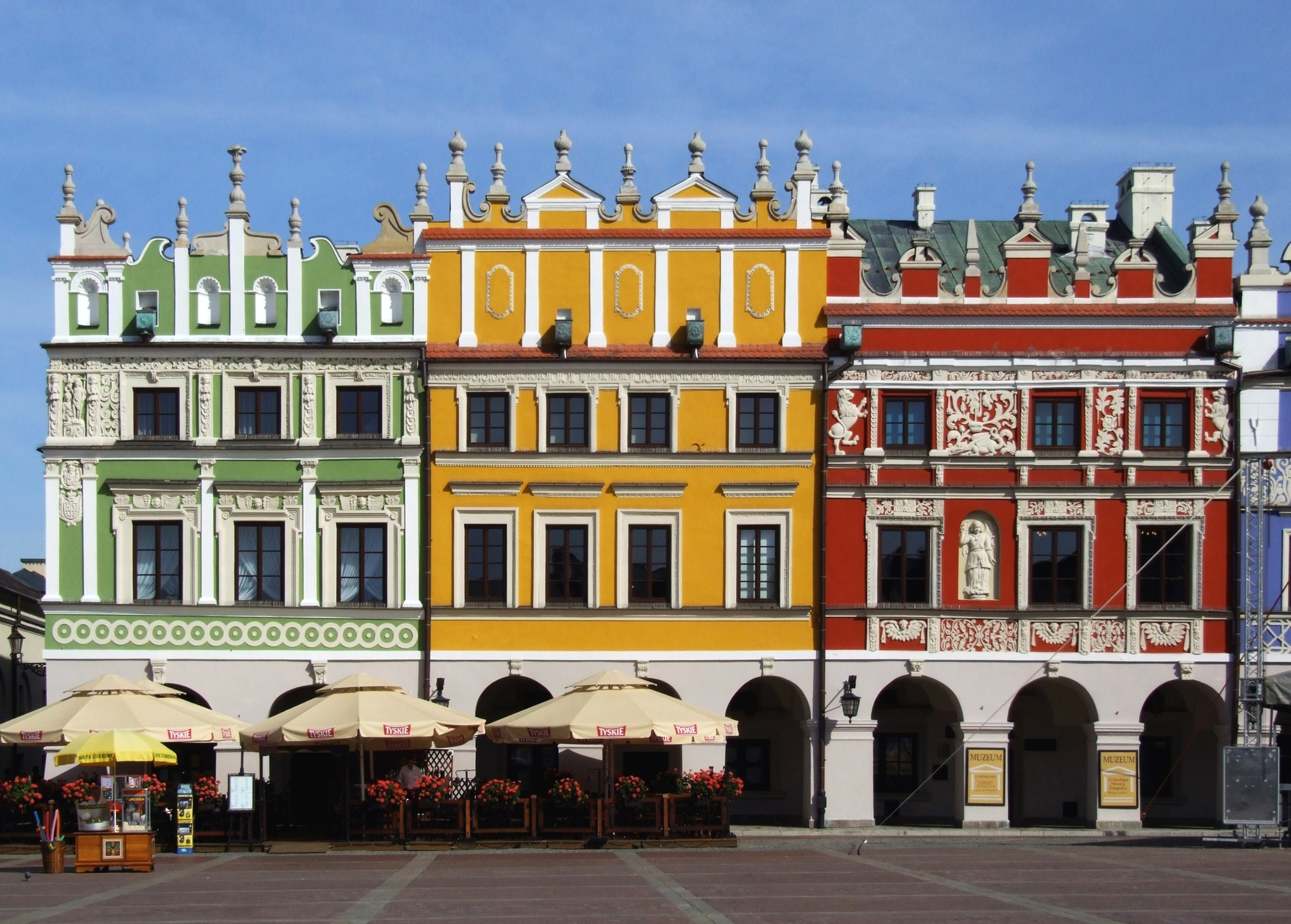
"Armenian houses" in Zamość

A fire at Wawel and the moving of the capital to Warsaw in 1596 halted the development of Renaissance in Kraków, as well as in Gdańsk. Also, the rising power of the Jesuits and the Counterreformation gave impetus to the development of Mannerist architecture and a new style – the Baroque (see also, Baroque in Poland). The most important example of the ascending Mannerist architecture in Poland is a complex of houses in Kazimierz Dolny and in Zamość.

== See also ==
- Polish Golden Age
- Lublin Renaissance
- Mannerist architecture and sculpture in Poland
- History of Poland (1385–1569)
- Ducal Castle, Szczecin
- Duchy of Pomerania
