= Hans Beham =

Hans Beham may refer to:

- Hans Sebald Beham (1500–1550), engraver, designer of woodcuts, painter and miniaturist born in Nuremberg
- Hans Beham, also of Nuremberg, who cast the Sigismund Bell in 1520, for the Wawel castle, Poland
