= The Hanging of the Sigismund Bell =

Painting by Jan Matejko

Zawieszenie dzwonu Zygmunta
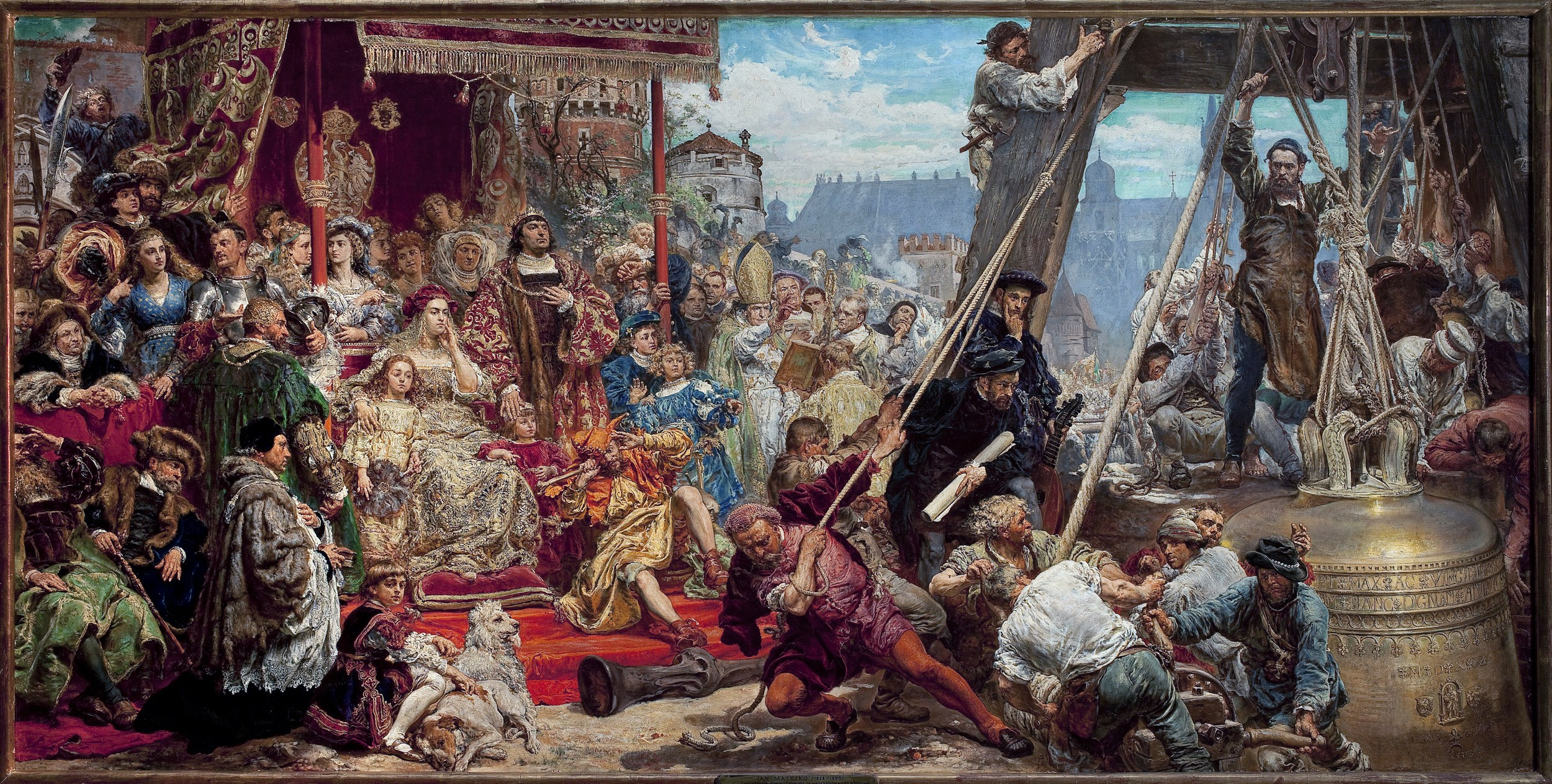
- Artist: Jan Matejko
- Year: 1874
- Medium: Oil on canvas
- Dimensions: 120 cm × 88 cm (47 in × 35 in)
- Location: National Museum, Warsaw

The Hanging of the Sigismund Bell (Polish: Zawieszenie dzwonu Zygmunta na wieży katedry w roku 1521 w Krakowie English: The Hanging of the Sigismund bell at the Cathedral Tower in 1521 in Kraków) is a painting by Jan Matejko finished in 1874. It depicts the installation of the Sigismund Bell in the Wawel Cathedral in Kraków in 1521. The bell was installed in the Sigismund Tower and rung for the first time on 13 July 1521. The bell is considered to be one of the national symbols of Poland. This painting is one of a number of historical paintings by Matejko. It shows a crowd of people, with a number of identifiable figures of historical importance. It conveys the Golden Era of the Polish Renaissance, and the power of the Kingdom of Poland.

There are several alternative names for the painting. They include The consecrating of the Sigismund bell... (Poświęcenie dzwonu Zygmunta...), as proposed by Mieczysław Treter, The raising of the Sigismund bell..., King Sigismund's Bell, or just Sigismund Bell (Dzwon Zygmunta).

== History ==
The Sigismund Bell painting was created in 1874. During his work, Matejko commissioned craftsmen to create a replica of a scaffolding that was used to move the bell, and he identified its likely original location, in order for it to be portrayed realistically.

There are numerous anecdotes associated with this painting. Matejko used his family for models, and likely the painting contains nearly all the members of his family. The painting was well received by contemporaries, and Stanisław Tarnowski published an extensive and positive review in 1875 in Przegląd Polski. The work was displayed in Paris in 1875, and probably contributed to Matejko's recognition by the Académie française; three years later it was displayed there again, during the Exposition Universelle (1878), and (together with two other paintings – the Unia lubelska (Union of Lublin) and Wacław Wilczek) yielded him an honorary golden medal.

The painting is in the collection of the National Museum, Warsaw.

== Composition and significance ==
Matejko was deeply interested in the era of the Renaissance in Poland, and this painting is one of a number of historical paintings that he set in that period. The composition is very colorful, yet realistic. It conveys the Golden Era of Polish Renaissance, and the power of the contemporary Kingdom of Poland, both its elites and the common people. The left side of the painting is focused on the richness and glory of the era, while the right notes the hard work of ordinary people that made this greatness possible. Although the painting is usually known as The hanging of the Sigismund bell.., in fact it shows not the moment of hanging but the moment of the bell's emergence from the mold in which it was cast.

The painting shows a crowd, with a number of identifiable figures of historical importance. On the left, there is the royal court, but only the king, Sigismund I, his family (including queen Bona Sforza), and the court jester, Stańczyk, can be identified. Sigismund, the patron of the Sigismund Bell, and his son Sigismund August, were Polish kings that inspired other works of Matejko, including The Babin Republic (1881) and The Founding of the Lubranski Academy in Poznań (1886). Sigismund I's portrayal on the Hanging... painting is the one where Matejko shows him with pride and respect. Other figures in the court include banker Jan Boner, merchant and official Seweryn Bethman, and castellan and voivode Stanisław Kmita. Bishop Jan Chojeński is also shown on the painting, consecrating the bell, with canon Grzegorz Lubrański nearby.

Outside the court, master bell-founder Hans Beham is seen above the bell. Between him and the court there are two dark-clad figures. These are the Wawel architect Bartolommeo Berrecci, and a musician, Valentin Bakfark, who according to a legend threw a string from his instrument into the melted bronze (in fact, he arrived in Poland two decades after the bell was cast). In the background, Wawel Castle can be seen.

As he would often do, Matejko included people whom he considered significant for the era, but who could not be present in the scene, like Sigismund I's son, Sigismund II August, who would have been only one year old. In 1885 Matejko would paint a sequel-like picture, Zygmunt I słuchający Dzwonu Zygmunta (Sigismund I listening to the Sigismund Bell), showing an older Sigismund and Stańczyk, contemplating the passing of their era.
