= Hans Beham (1480–1533) =

German bell-founder and artillery craftsman

- Born: c. 1480; Nuremberg
- Died: before May 21, 1533; Kraków
- Occupation: bell-founder
- Parents: Hans Beham the Elder (father); Elżbieta Rossner (mother)

Hans Beham (Note: Also Behem or Behaim. Surnames were commonly used and recorded in various forms. During the 15th and 16th centuries, it was prevalent in the German-speaking regions, Switzerland, Bohemia, Silesia, and Hungary. It was associated with numerous artisans, including blacksmiths, bell-founders, seal engravers, mint workers, engravers, goldsmiths, and painters. Additionally, records mention individuals such as a stonemason and builder, a printer, and a type-caster bearing this name. The surname likely originated as a nickname denoting Czech ancestry or origins (Rokosz (2006, pp. 217–218)).) (born circa 1480 in Nuremberg, died 1533 in Kraków) was a German bell-founder and artillery craftsman in the service of King Sigismund I the Old.

Active in Nuremberg from around 1498, he primarily worked on casting cannons, with less frequent involvement in bell production. Likely arriving in Kraków in 1518, he created The Sigismund Bell two years later. From 1522 until his death, he served as a royal servitor, supervisor of royal gunners and the arsenal, and senior gunner.

== Biography ==
=== Origins ===
Hans Beham was born around 1480 as the younger son of Hans Beham the Elder (died 1498), who was either a blacksmith or a coppersmith. At about 18 years old, Hans inherited his father's workshop. Initially, he likely followed his father's trade but later shifted his focus to bellfounding and gun-making.

=== Activities in Germany ===
At the time, Nuremberg was a leading center for bellfounding and gun-making, attracting commissions from across Europe. Beham primarily worked on casting cannons and cannonballs. As early as 1501–1502, he sold cannon barrels to Bamberg, and in 1506, he established business relations with Duke Frederick III. Between 1506 and 1507, records indicate he worked in Torgau, as evidenced by accounts with the banker Hans Leinbach. In 1508, he produced several cannons for Count von Mansfeld.

Beham occasionally cast bells. In 1511, he collaborated with his nephew, Sebald Behaim the Elder, to cast a relatively large bell for the parish church in Bayreuth. Between 1514 and 1515, he negotiated further cannon orders for Bamberg and continued to appear in the city's municipal records over the next two years.

=== Activities in Poland ===
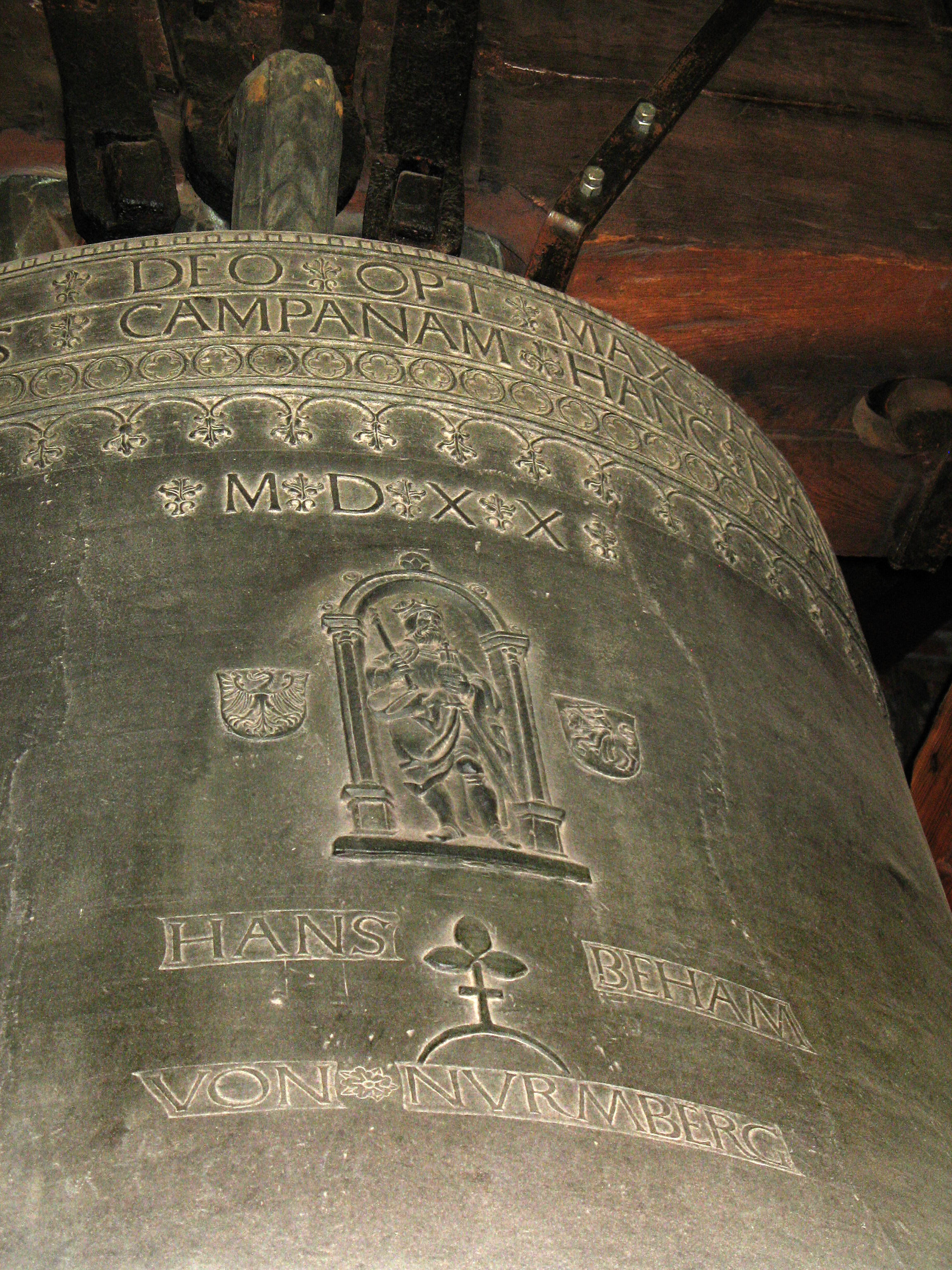
German inscription on the waist of The Sigismund Bell

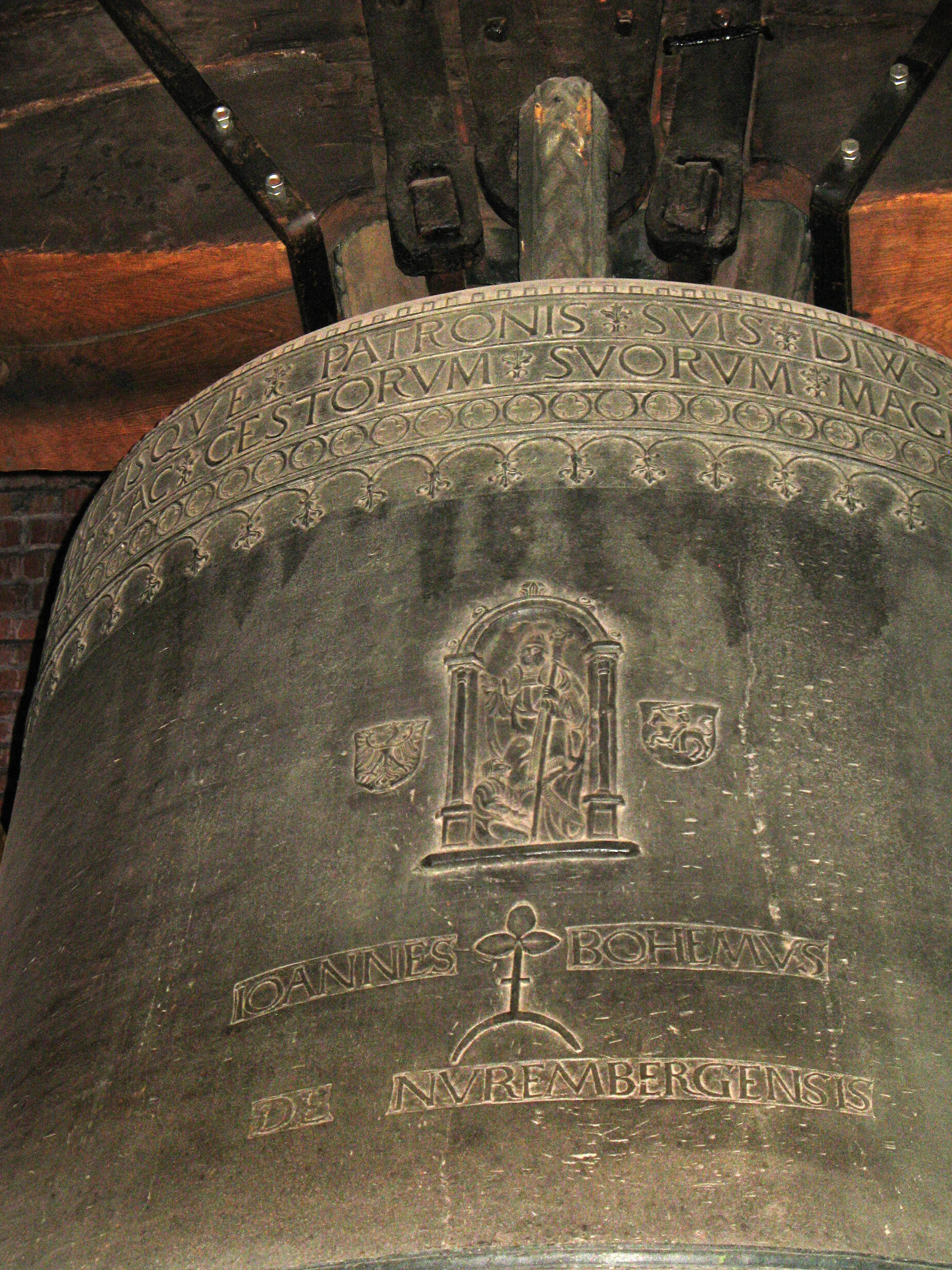
Latin inscription on the waist of The Sigismund Bell

In 1517, Hans Beham delivered 35 bombards with a total weight of 290 hundredweights to Kraków. From this time, he appeared in the city's municipal records, listed as "Hannes Beham boxe magister" or "Meister Hans Buchsergisser". It is likely that he moved to Kraków the following year. His decision to settle there might have been influenced by the expectation of fewer competitors compared to Nuremberg, as well as the respect that Nuremberg craftsmen enjoyed in Poland. One of his first commissions was probably the casting of a bell for the Church of St. Margaret in Raciborowice, which was under the patronage of the cathedral chapter. This unsigned bell, still preserved, is considered his work based on stylistic features such as decorative motifs and the antiqua-like letter case used in the inscription.

Thanks to the patronage of Jan Boner or the cathedral chapter, Beham attracted the attention of the royal court. The king's interest in Nuremberg craftsmanship might have also played a role. In 1520, Beham served as the senior gunner during the Polish–Teutonic War. That same year, he was commissioned to cast The Sigismund Bell for the Wawel Cathedral, funded by the monarch. Beham completed the work in the latter half of the year (Note: Bochniak (2021, p. 12) cites December 1520 or January 1521 as the casting date for the bell, emphasizing, however, that determining the exact date is not possible.) and likely oversaw the installation between 9 and 13 July 1521.

He placed his signature on the bell in two locations. On one side of the bell's waist, beneath the plaque with Sigismund of Burgundy, was the inscription "HANS BEHAM VON NVRMBERG", divided by his house mark, which depicted a three-leafed clover, or alternatively, a cross supported by a crescent moon topped with a three-leaf clover. Below the plaque with Stanislaus of Szczepanów, the inscription "IOANNES BOHEMVS DE NVREMBERGENSIS" appeared, again divided by his house mark. Although the large house mark (17.5 cm high, twice the size of the royal coats of arms) was an original feature of the bell's decoration, the German and Latin signatures were added later and were carved in a style that was inconsistent with the rest of the bell's design. The edges of the inscriptions are uneven, and some of the letters are poorly rendered. It's likely that Beham himself had little involvement in the carving of these signatures, and the form of his name used is one that he would not have typically employed.

The successful completion of this commission strengthened Beham's position, and on 12 March 1522, he was formally accepted into royal service. As a servant to the king, he became the supervisor of the royal bell-founders and the arsenal. Five years later, on 27 November 1527, Seweryn Boner, acting on behalf of the monarch, renewed Beham's contract for another ten years. Under the terms of the contract, Beham was to receive an annual salary of 200 florins and was exempted from municipal taxes. He was highly regarded by the monarch, who arranged for Beham to be given a separate residence at Wawel Castle. The royal couple, Sigismund I and Bona Sforza, visited him at his Kraków bell foundry on 18 December 1524 to observe the casting of cannonballs, (Note: The date of this event is known thanks to a note by the court physician Mikołaj Sokolnicki in the margin of one of his astronomical ephemerides (Rokosz (2006, p. 221)).) a time of heightened royal interest in military rearmament following the Turkish and Tatar invasions of Podolia in the summer of that year.

Beham remained in royal service until his death, which most likely occurred in 1533. His wife, Elżbieta Rossner, was listed as a widow in the municipal records on 21 May 1533, confirming that she had inherited his estate.

== Matejko's painting ==
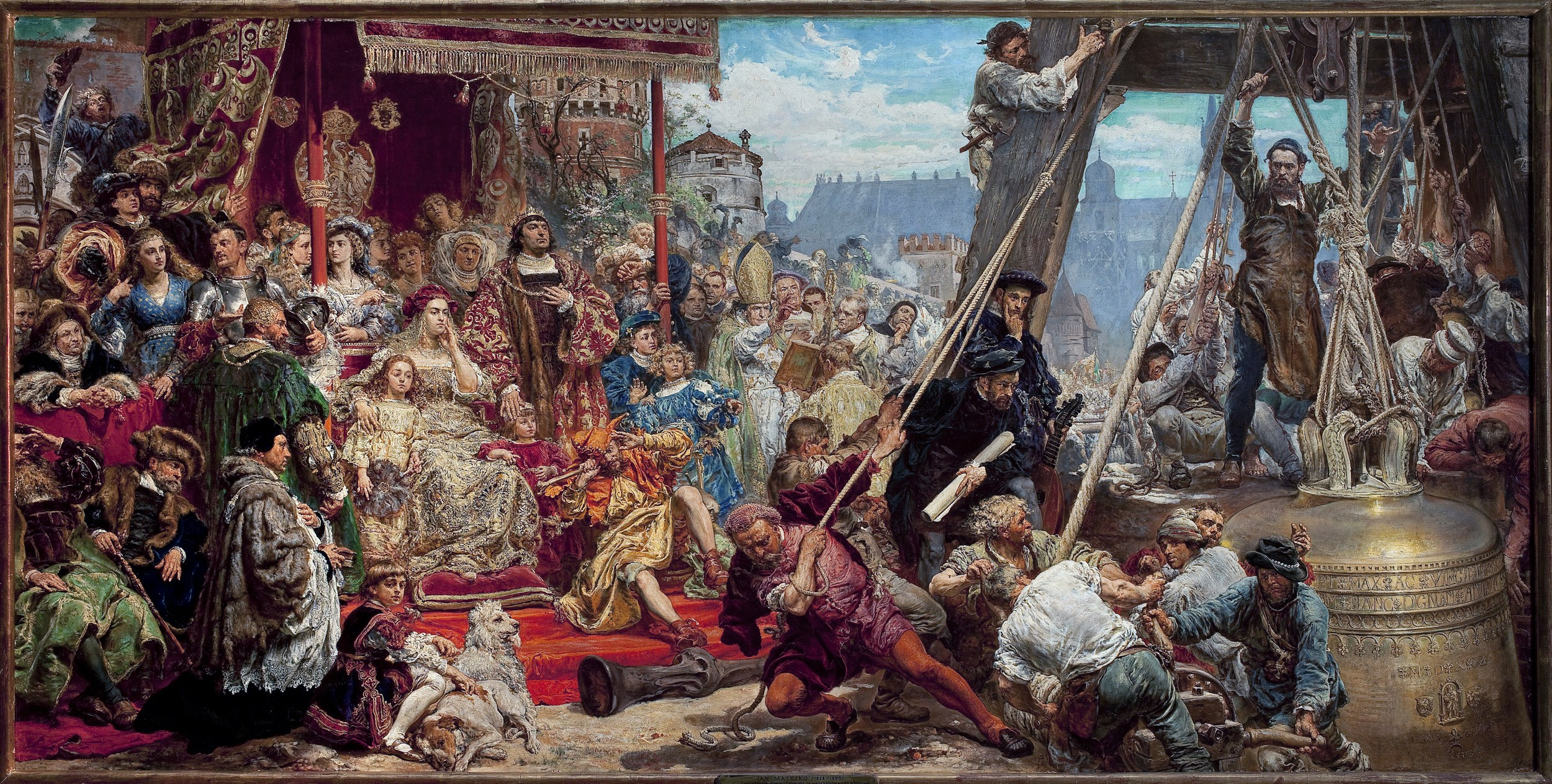
Jan Matejko, Hanging of the Sigismund Bell (1874))

Jan Matejko included the figure of Beham in his painting The Hanging of the Sigismund Bell. He depicted him in the right part of the canvas, dressed in a leather apron, standing prominently among the group of craftsmen lifting the bell. According to Mieczysław Porębski, the figures of the bell founder and the king are the main protagonists of this painting.

== Bibliography ==
- Bochniak, Andrzej (2021). 500 lat Dzwonu Zygmunta. Wybrane fakty i ciekawostki, nowe spostrzeżenia [500 Years of the Sigismund Bell: Selected Facts and Curiosities, New Insights] (in Polish) (2nd ed.). Katowice: Książki Naukowe i Specjalistyczne. ISBN 978-83-64534-34-8.
- Rokosz, Mieczysław (2006). Dzwony i wieże Wawelu [The Bells and Towers of Wawel] (in Polish). Kraków: Societas Vistulana. ISBN 83-88385-73-9.
