= Jadwiga Tarło-Mniszech =

Polish noblewoman

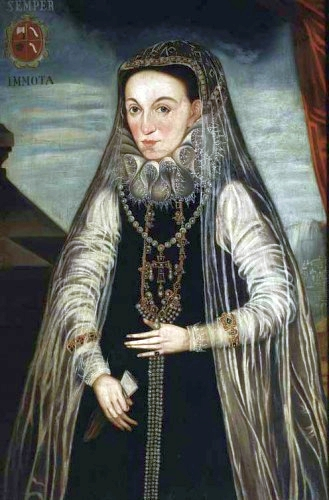
Szwankowski Jadwiga Mniszech

Jadwiga Tarło-Mniszech (b. between 1560 and 1570 – 1629) was a Polish noblewoman in the Polish–Lithuanian Commonwealth. Coat of arms – Topór. Married Jerzy Mniszech (died 1613) who was Krajczy koronny in 1574, castellan of Radom in 1583, Voivode of Sandomierz in 1590, żupnik of Ruthenia, starost of Lwów in 1593, starost of Sambor, Sokal, Sanok and Rohatyn.

== Children ==
- Marina Mniszech (c. 1588–1614)
- Urszula Mniszech (b. 1603)
- Eufrozyna Mniszech
- Anna Mniszech
- Stanisław Bonifacy Mniszech (d. 1644)
- Stefan Jan Mniszech
- Franciszek Bernard Mniszech
- Mikołaj Mniszech (1587 -1613) – starosta łukowski
- Zygmunt Mniszech
