= St. Leonard's Crypt =

Burial place of famous Poles

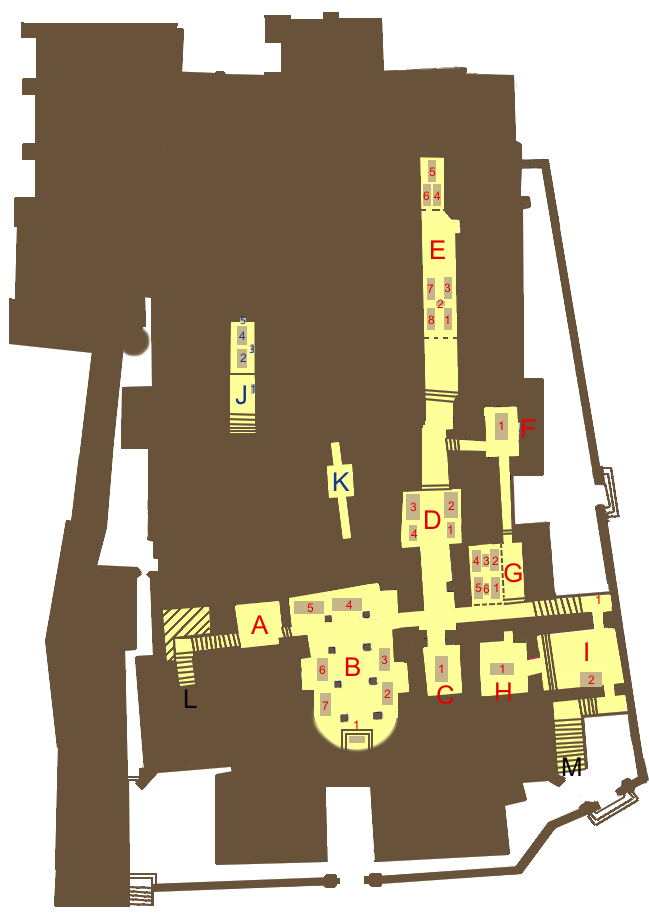
Location of St. Leonard's Crypt (B) under the Wawel Cathedral

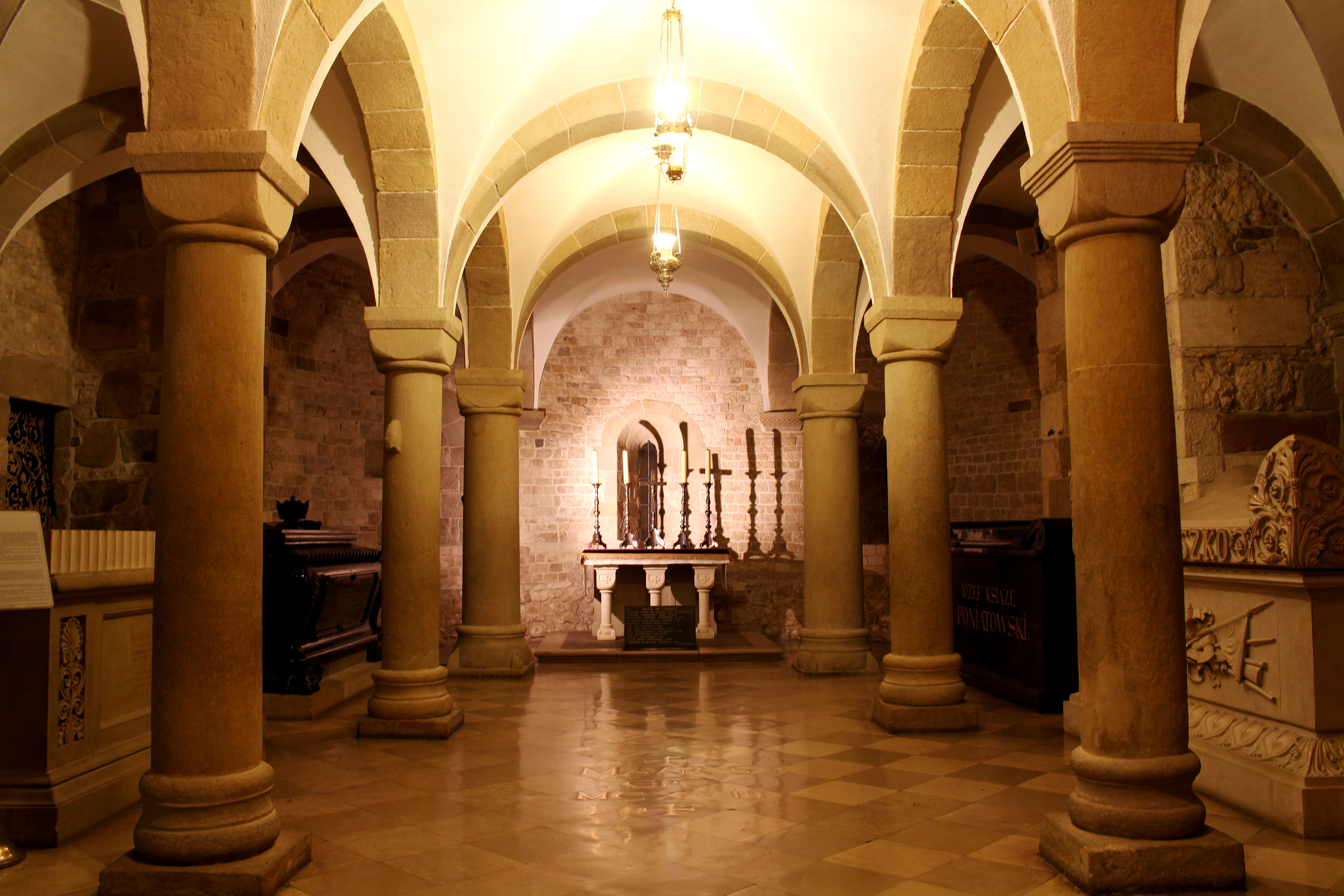
St. Leonard's Crypt, with tomb of Jan III Sobieski.

St. Leonard's Crypt (Polish: Krypta św. Leonarda na Wawelu) under the Wawel Cathedral in Kraków, Poland, is a Romanesque crypt founded in the 11th century (around 1038–1039) by Casimir I the Restorer who made Kraków his royal residence as the capital.

At the end of the 11th century construction work began on the cathedral called ‘Hermanowska’. It is probable that Władysław I Herman was its benefactor. The cathedral was consecrated in 1142. More is known about this new structure because its image is featured on a chapter house seal from the 13th century and its present-day remnants are well preserved – including the lower part of the Silver Bell Tower.

The entire St. Leonard's Crypt is supported by eight columns. In 1118 bishop Maurus was buried there. The paten and the chalice were later exhumed from the tomb. This period also gave rise to the Rotunda by the Bastion of Ladislaus IV of Hungary from the 12th century, which could have been a baptistery for the royalty, the Church near the Dragon's Den, and the Rotunda by the Sandomierska Tower – probably from the second half of the 11th century.

The crypt holds the tombs of Polish kings and heroes such as:

- Michael I – King of Poland and Grand Duke of Lithuania
- John III Sobieski – King of Poland and Grand Duke of Lithuania, commander at the Battle of Vienna
- Marie Casimire – Queen Consort of Poland and Grand Duchess Consort of Lithuania, wife of John III Sobieski
- Józef Poniatowski – Prince of Poland and Marshal of France
- Tadeusz Kościuszko – Polish general, revolutionary and a brigadier general in the American Revolutionary War
- Władysław Sikorski – Prime Minister of the Polish Government in Exile and Commander-in-Chief of the Polish Armed Forces

Pope John Paul II said his first Mass on the altar in St. Leonard's Crypt on November 2, 1946, one day after his priestly ordination.
