= National symbols of Poland =

National symbols of Poland (Polish: Polskie symbole narodowe) are the tangible and intangible symbols, emblems or images that are found in Poland to represent the country's unique customs, traditions, cultural life, and its over 1000-year history. These symbols serve as the nation's portrayal of patriotism and dedication to their national identity. The Polish people and the Polish diaspora around the world take great pride in their native country, and associate themselves with the colours white and red. The expression biało-czerwoni ("whitereds") is widely used by Poles when referring to their compatriots. A crowned white-tailed eagle on a red shield or background has been Poland's national symbol and coat of arms since the Middle Ages. Other unofficial symbols feature visual personifications, music of Chopin, polonaise and mazurka dances, animals such as the European bison or the white stork, apples, red poppy flowers and religious insignia of the Roman Catholic church. Several have been popularised in recent years, notably the winged hussars.

== Official symbols ==
The official symbols of the Republic of Poland are described in two legal documents: the Constitution of the Republic of Poland of 1997 (Polish: Konstytucja Rzeczypospolitej Polskiej) and the Coat of Arms, Colours and Anthem of the Republic of Poland, and State Seals Act (Polish: Ustawa o godle, barwach i hymnie Rzeczypospolitej Polskiej oraz o pieczęciach państwowych) of 1980 with subsequent amendments. The Jack of the President is defined in the Ordinance of the Minister of National Defense on the Use of Insignia of the Armed Forces of January 26, 1996 with subsequent amendments.

Type	Image	Symbol
National flag		The flag of Poland (Polish: Flaga Polski) consists of two horizontal stripes of equal width, the upper one white and the lower one red. The two colours are defined in the Polish constitution as the national colours. They are of heraldic origin and derive from the tinctures (colours) of the coats of arms of the two constituent nations of the Polish–Lithuanian Commonwealth, i.e. the White Eagle of Poland and the Pursuer of the Grand Duchy of Lithuania, a white knight riding a white horse, both on a red shield.
Coat of arms		The White Eagle (Polish: Orzeł Biały) is the national coat of arms of Poland. It is a stylized white eagle with a golden beak and talons, and wearing a golden crown, in a red shield.
National anthem		Jan Dąbrowski's Mazurka (Polish: Mazurek Dąbrowskiego) is the national anthem of Poland. The official English title is a translation of its Polish incipit, "Poland Is Not Yet Lost". The lyrics were written by Józef Wybicki in July, 1797, two years after the Third Partition of Poland. The music is an unattributed mazurka and considered a "folk tune" that was altered to suit the lyrics. It was originally meant to boost the morale of Polish soldiers serving under Dąbrowski's Polish Legions in the Italian campaigns of the French Revolutionary Wars. "Dabrowski's Mazurka", expressing the idea that the nation of Poland, despite lack of independence, had not disappeared as long as the Polish people were still alive and fighting in its name, soon became one of the most popular patriotic songs in Poland. When Poland re-emerged as an independent state in 1918, "Dabrowski's Mazurka" became its de facto anthem. It was officially adopted as the national anthem of the Second Polish Republic in 1926.
Official language		Polish language (Polish: Język polski)
National day		National Independence Day (Polish: Narodowe Święto Niepodległości)
Presidential pennant		The pennant of the president of the Republic of Poland, Commander-in-Chief of the Armed Forces of the Republic of Poland (Polish: proporzec Prezydenta Rzeczypospolitej Polskiej – Zwierzchnika Sił Zbrojnych Rzeczypospolitej Polskiej) is a jack flag used in the Polish Armed Forces to mark the presence and pay respect to the President of the Republic of Poland who is also ex officio the commander-in-chief of the Armed Forces. The jack is raised on Polish Navy ships when the president is officially on board, as well as on land, if the president is present. The design of the jack is based directly on the pre-war Banner of the Republic of Poland which used to be part of presidential insignia. The ordinance defines the jack of the President as "a piece of red cloth with the image of the state eagle (i.e. the White Eagle from the national coat of arms) in the middle, bordered with a wężyk generalski", an ornate wavy line used in the Polish military as a symbol of general's rank.

== Other symbols ==
Type	Image	Symbol
National animal		The European bison (Bison bonasus) is one of the national animals of Poland.
National animal		The White stork (Ciconia ciconia) has a long history with Poland and is believed to be one of the national animals of the country.
National animal		Poland's enduring national symbol has been the white-tailed eagle (Haliaeetus albicilla), shown in the coat of arms.
National mottos		Poland has no official motto of the State, namely the one which is recognised as such by the Polish national law. However, there are some common phrases which appear commonly on banners, flags and other symbols of the Polish state. One of the most common of such unofficial mottos is Za wolność Naszą i Waszą ("For our freedom and yours"). Another one is Bóg, Honor, Ojczyzna ("God, Honour, Fatherland"). During the times of the Polish–Lithuanian Commonwealth, the Latin expression Pro Fide, Lege et Rege ("For Faith, Law and King") was in use.
National bell		The Sigismund Bell (Dzwon Zygmunt or Dzwon Zygmunta). Named after King Sigismund I of Poland and cast in 1520, it hangs at Wawel Cathedral in Kraków. At present, it is the second-largest bell in the country and is rung only on special occasions. It is not automated and twelve individuals are required to manually swing it.
Ethnonyms		The ethnonyms for the Poles (people) and Poland (their country) include endonyms (the way Polish people refer to themselves and their country) and exonyms (the way other peoples refer to the Poles and their country). Endonyms and most exonyms for Poles and Poland derive from the name of a Lechitic tribe of Western Polans (Polanie), while in some languages the exonyms for Poland derive from the name of another tribe – the Lendians (Lędzianie). The Polish words for a Pole are Polak (masculine) and Polka (feminine), Polki being the plural form for two or more women and Polacy being the plural form for the rest. The adjective "Polish" translates to Polish as polski (masculine), polska (feminine) and polskie (neuter). The common Polish name for Poland is Polska.
Rzeczpospolita		The full official name of Poland is Rzeczpospolita Polska which loosely translates as "Republic of Poland". The word rzeczpospolita ("pospolita" - common and "rzecz" - an item signifying wealth, hence Commonwealth) derives from the Latin res publica and has been used in Poland since at least the 16th century, originally a generic term to denote any state with a republican or similar form of government. Today, however, the word is used almost solely in reference to the Polish state.
National personification		Polonia, the name for Poland in Latin and many Romance and other languages, is most often used in modern Polish as referring to the Polish diaspora. However it was also used as a national personification or the symbolic depiction of Poland as a woman called by the Latin name of that country was common in the 19th century. This is exemplified in Jan Matejko's painting Polonia, depicting the aftermath of the failed January 1863 Uprising, one of the most patriotic and symbolic paintings by Matejko. Other personifications of Poland were created by artists like Stanisław Wyspiański and Jacek Malczewski.
National tree		Pedunculate oak (Quercus robur)
National flower		Red poppy (Papaver rhoeas), strongly associated with the battle of Monte Cassino in 1944 where the 2nd Corps of the Polish Armed Forces led the decisive assault that resulted in Allied victory. Poppies growing on the battlefield became a symbol of bravery and sacrifice through a song "The Red Poppies on Monte Cassino" composed by a duo of soldiers-artists on the last night of the fighting.
National costume		Polish traditional clothing
National hat		Rogatywka
National mountains		Rysy (2,501 m), Poland's highest mountain or Giewont (1,894m), legendary symbol of the Polish Tatras
National river		Vistula (Polish: Wisła)
National dance		Polish folk dances are a tradition rooted in ten centuries of Polish culture and history. The Polish national dances are the Krakowiak, Kujawiak, Mazurek, Oberek, and Polonaise. These dances are classified as National, because almost every region in Poland has displayed a variety of these dances.
National fruit		Apple (Malus domestica)
National beverage		Vodka (Polish: wódka, gorzała, okowita)
National beverage		Polish mead (Polish: miód pitny) is an alcoholic beverage within Polish culinary tradition made by alcoholic fermentation of a mixture of honey and water. It has a characteristic honey aroma and a flavour that may be enriched by the addition of fruit juices, herbs or spices. The colour ranges from golden to dark amber, depending on the type of honey used for production.
National dish		Bigos, a hunters' stew made with cabbage and various kinds of meat. As with several other Polish foods, it is traditionally served in a bread bowl; it is served on Christmas Day and serves as one of the most important and oldest dishes of Polish cuisine, considered by some as the national dish.
National dish		Pierogi (singular: pieróg) are Polish dumplings that can have various savoury or sweet fillings, and are known as an enduring symbol of Polish national cuisine both in Poland and among Polish diaspora. Pierogi ruskie (Ruthenian pierogi), originating in south-east Poland (historically known as Red Ruthenia or Galicia) are considered by many Poles as the national dish.

== See also ==
- Culture of Poland
