= Jan Boner =

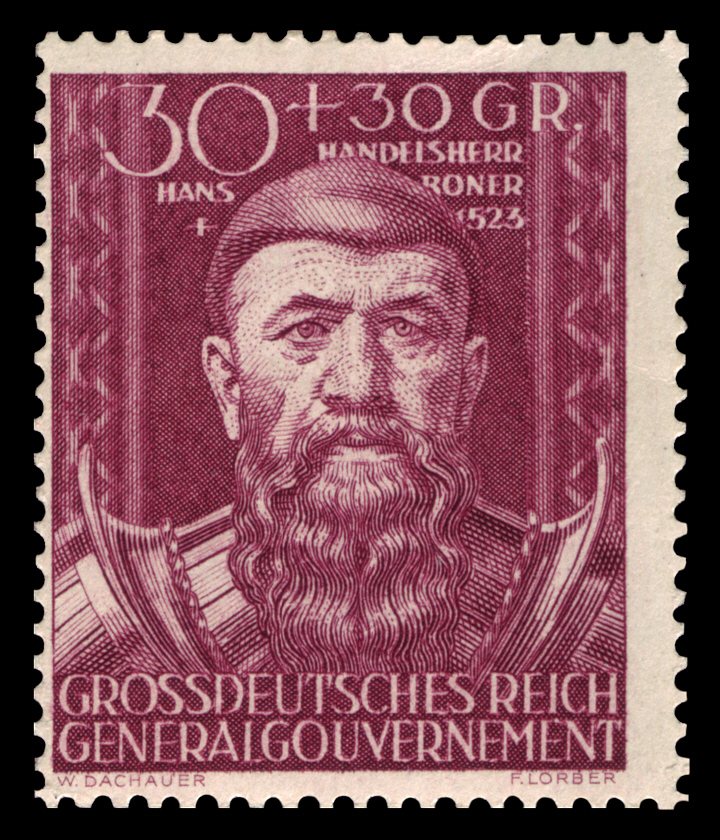
Hans Boner on a stamp from 1944

Jan Boner (before 1463–1523), also known as Hans Boner, was a German naturalised Polish merchant and banker. He was one of the wealthiest people of his time in Europe.

Born before 1463 in Landau in Palatinate, early in his life he started a merchant business in Breslau. In 1483 he settled in Kraków, in Poland. A wealthy merchant and tradesman dealing with spices, metals, timbers, livestock, etc., he opened branch offices of his firm in many towns of Poland, Germany, Russia and Hungary. In 1498, he was elected to the Town's Charter, and in 1514, he was granted citizenship by King Sigismund I of Poland, who granted him with a noble status.

As the king's banker and main purveyor to the royal court, Boner became one of the wealthiest men in Europe of his times. Among other deeds, he was able to recover the royal treasury from the verge of bankruptcy, having strengthened it with roughly 200,000 Red złoty, an incredible sum for 15th century standards. He bought off the Royal properties for debts, among them the entire area of Spisz (for 12,000 Red złoty from Jordan of Zakliczyn), the town of Oświęcim and Ruthenian salt mines (for 14,000 Red złoty from Stanisław Kościelski) and a number of royal towns (including Sieradz, Gostynin, Radom, Sochaczew, Piotrków, Drohobycz, Rabsztyn, Głuchów, Tuchola, Nowy Sącz, Inowrocław and others).

In 1515, he became the manager of the Wieliczka salt mine, one of the most profitable enterprises of the epoch, from which a large part of the Poland's income was drawn. He also received the castles of Ojców and Rabsztyn as his private property. In 1522, he also became the royal governor of Kraków.

Among his most notable successes was a division of the treasury between state and royal treasuries, an arrangement that survived until the Partitions of Poland in the late 18th century. He served as financier to the King of Poland, and acted as a representative for handling money paid to buy indulgences in Poland. He was a patron of German and Italian scholars and artists.

He died in 1523 in Breslau, during a business trip.

He is featured in Jan Matejko's painting The Hanging of the Sigismund Bell.

== Notes and references ==
In-line:

General:

1. (in Polish) Biography of Jan Boner
