= The Sigismund Bell =

Bell in Wawel Cathedral, Kraków, Poland

Coordinates: 50°03′17″N 19°56′09″E

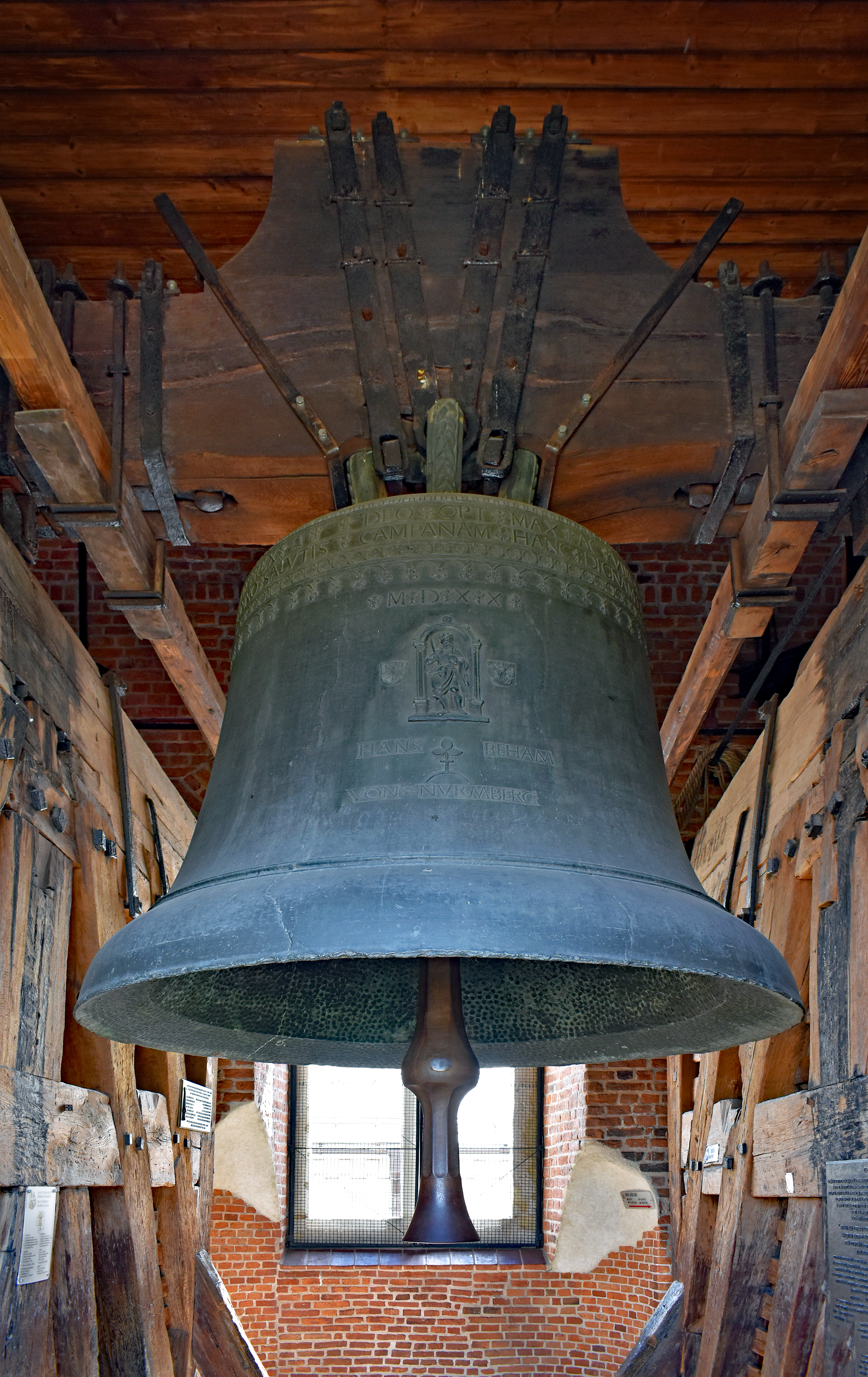
Closeup of the Sigismund Bell.

The Sigismund Bell (Polish: Dzwon Zygmunt or colloquially Dzwon Zygmunta) is the largest of the five bells hanging in the Sigismund Tower of the Wawel Cathedral in the city of Kraków, Poland. It was cast in 1520 by Hans Beham and named after King Sigismund I the Old, who commissioned it. The bell weighs almost 13 tonnes (28 thousand pounds) and requires 12 bell-ringers to manually swing it. It tolls on special occasions, mostly religious and national holidays, and is regarded as one of Poland's national symbols.

== Description ==
The body of the Sigismund Bell is cast in bronze and weighs 9,650 kg. Its diameter at the lip is 242 cm and its height is 241 cm. The wall of the body is from 7 to 21 cm thick. The crown of the bell is attached to a yoke made of oak wood and measuring 308 cm in length and 219 cm in height. Within the bell, suspended on a leather belt of up to 12 layers, attached to an iron supporting structure, is a Gothic clapper, weighing – together with the belt – 365 kg.

The body of the bell is decorated with inscriptions and images. Around the upper part of the waist runs a majuscule Renaissance Latin inscription indicating the bell's donor and dedicating it to God:

Deo Opt Max ac Virgini Deiparae sanctisque patronis suis divus Sigismundus Poloniae Rex
campanam hanc dignam animi operumque ac gestorum suorum magnitudine fieri fecit anno salutis
MDXX

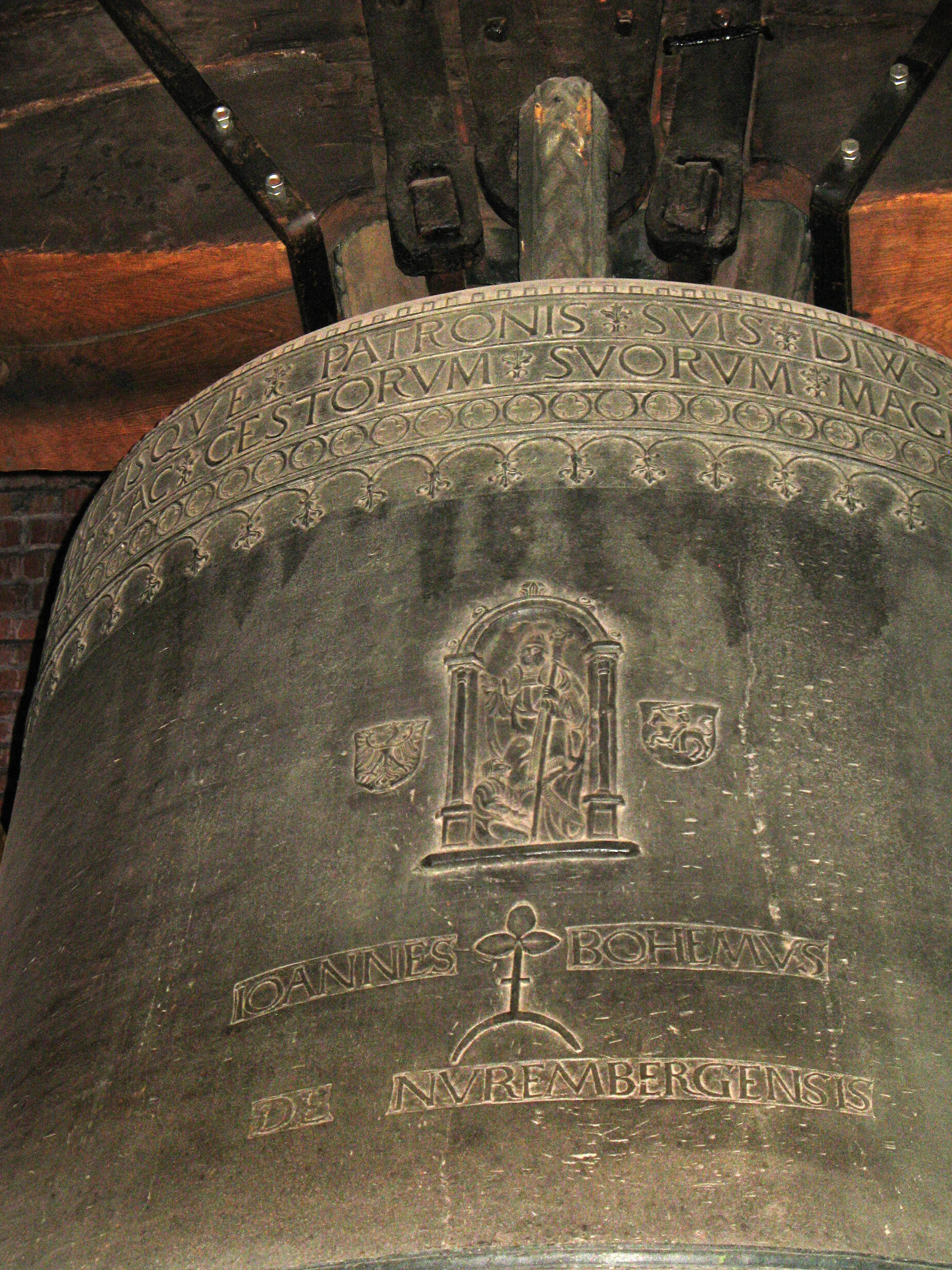
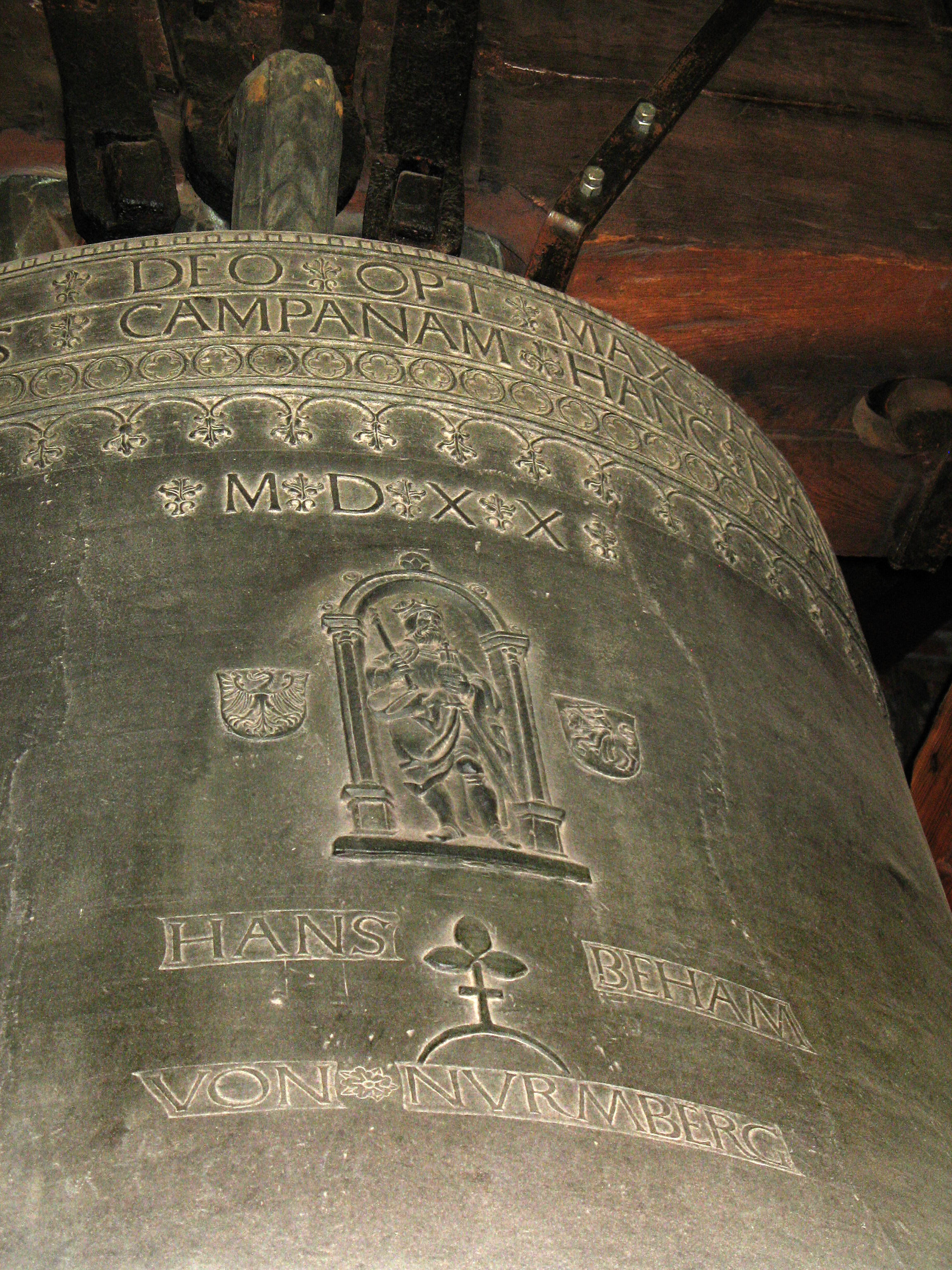
Images of Saint Stanislaus (left) and Saint Sigismund (right) on the waist of the belt

The inscription translates as follows: "To the greatest and best God, and to the Virgin Mother of God, the illustrious King Sigismund of Poland had this bell cast to be worthy of the greatness of his mind and deeds in the year of salvation 1520." Below the inscription there are two portal-shaped plaques with images of saints. The one below the date "MDXX" (1520 in Roman numerals) is a likeness of Saint Sigismund, patron saint of the bell and of the king who commissioned it, dressed in royal vestments and insignia as a king of Burgundy.

On the opposite side of the bell, there is a corresponding image of Saint Stanislaus wearing episcopal robes and holding a crosier as a bishop of Kraków. Stanislaus is venerated as a patron saint of the Wawel Cathedral and, by extension, of Kraków and all Poland. Both images are placed between heraldic shields bearing the coats of arms of the two nations of Sigismund I's realm – the White Eagle of the Kingdom of Poland on the left, and the Knight of the Grand Duchy of Lithuania on the right.

Below each of these images, there is the name of the bell's caster in German (below Saint Sigismund) or Latin (below Saint Stanislaus), as well as his house mark. Both inscriptions, quoted below, translate as "Hans Beham of Nuremberg".

Hans Beham
von Nurmberg

Ioannes Bohemus
de Nurembergensis

== History ==
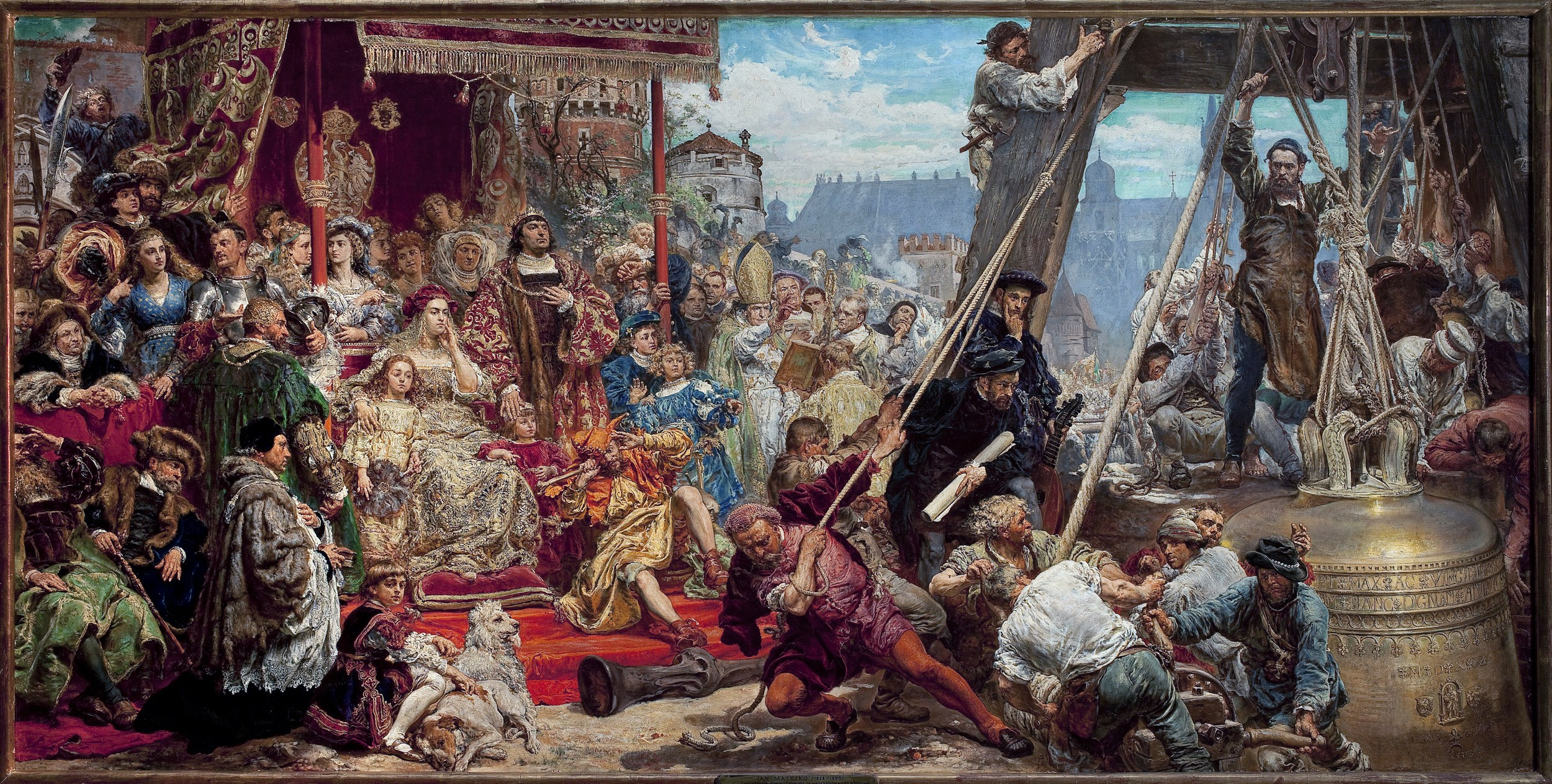
King Sigismund I, with his family and court, observes the hanging of the Sigismund Bell in 1521. Jan Matejko, Zawieszenie dzwonu Zygmunta (1874).

The Sigismund Bell was commissioned for the Wawel Cathedral by Sigismund I, King of Poland and Grand Duke of Lithuania. It was cast by Hans Behem (or Beham) of Nuremberg in 1520. Behem set up a special foundry near Kraków's Florian Gate where he is said to have used scrap metal taken from the cannons captured by Polish–Lithuanian forces from the Muscovite army in the Battle of Orsha in 1514. A similar and clearly incorrect legend identifies the source of metal as the battle of Obertyn (1531). The bell was installed in the Sigismund Tower and rung for the first time on 13 July 1521.

Apart from major religious and national holidays, the bell was rung on some of the most significant moments in the history of Poland, including the German invasion of Poland on 1 September 1939, on the eve of Poland's entry into the European Union on 30 April 2004, on the occasion of each visit by Pope John Paul II, and after the plane crash which killed President Lech Kaczyński and dozens of other high-ranking officials on 10 April 2010. It also tolled during funerals or reburials of several great Poles, such as Adam Mickiewicz (1900), Marshal Józef Piłsudski (1935), General Władysław Sikorski (1993), Pope John Paul II (2005), and Lech Kaczyński with his wife (2010). It rang defiantly on Polish national holidays in the times of partitions (1795–1918) and under the communist regime (1945–1989), thus reinforcing its role as a national symbol.

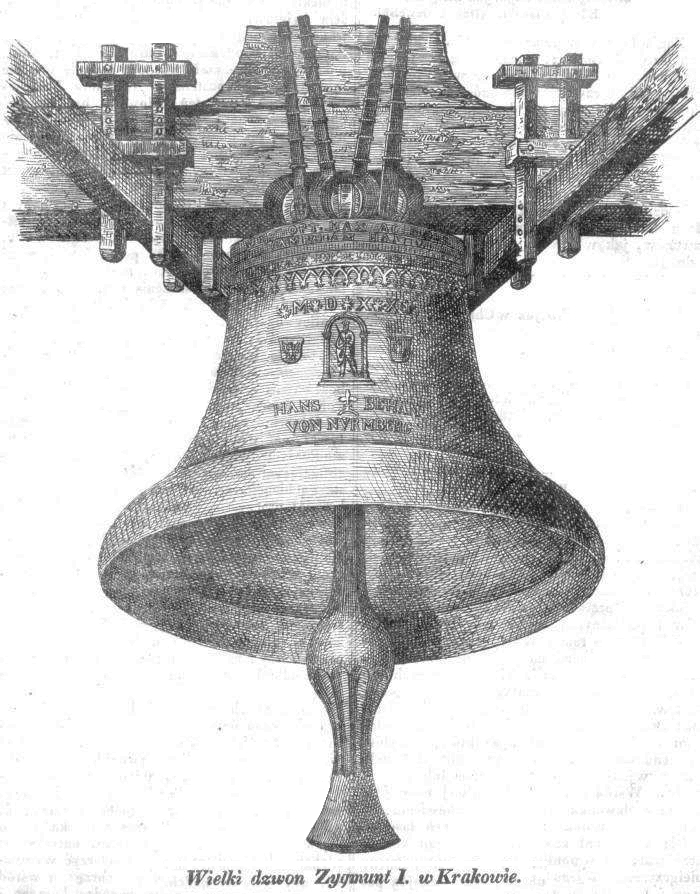
The Sigismund Bell on an 1841 lithograph/

Hans Frank, the governor-general of the General Government, had the Sigismund Bell rung in 1940 to celebrate the German victory over France. After the death of Soviet dictator Joseph Stalin in 1953, Poland's communist authorities demanded that the bell be rung as a sign of mourning. When the cathedral's bell-ringers refused, soldiers were ordered to ring the bell instead, or – depending on the source – it was rung by a group of Communist activists.

On at least one occasion, the bell was also rung as a juvenile prank. According to several memoirists, in 1882, Stanisław Estreicher, Józef Mehoffer, Henryk Opieński, and Stanisław Wyspiański – then in their high school years – sneaked onto the Sigismund tower and managed to toll the bell. When Wyspiański was caught, the bishop wished him that Sigismund ring at his funeral – which actually happened in 1907. An experiment conducted in 2011 to verify the plausibility of this anecdote showed that four teenagers would have been unable to toll the bell properly, but they could have swung the clapper enough to make a ringing sound.

The original iron clapper made about 12 million strokes during the 479 years of its history. During the 19th century, it broke and underwent repairs in 1859, 1865, and 1876. After it broke again on 25 December 2000, it was replaced by a new one – paid for and cast by Kraków metallurgic companies – on 14 April 2001.

=== Present day ===
The Sigismund Bell rings in important moments for Krakow and Poland, in recent years, among others:

- March 25, 2020 - during prayer for the end of the COVID-19 pandemic
- July 13, 2021 - on the occasion of his own 500th anniversary, Zygmunt called twice: around 5:15 p.m. and at 9:00 p.m.
- September 2, 2021 - after the death of the rector of the Wawel Cathedral, Fr. Zdzisław Sochacki.
- March 6, 2022 - the bell rang in support for the fighting Ukraine, attacked on February 24, 2022 by Russia
- December 31, 2022 - after the death of Benedict XVI
- January 5, 2023 - during the funeral of Benedict XVI in the Vatican

== Bell-ringers ==
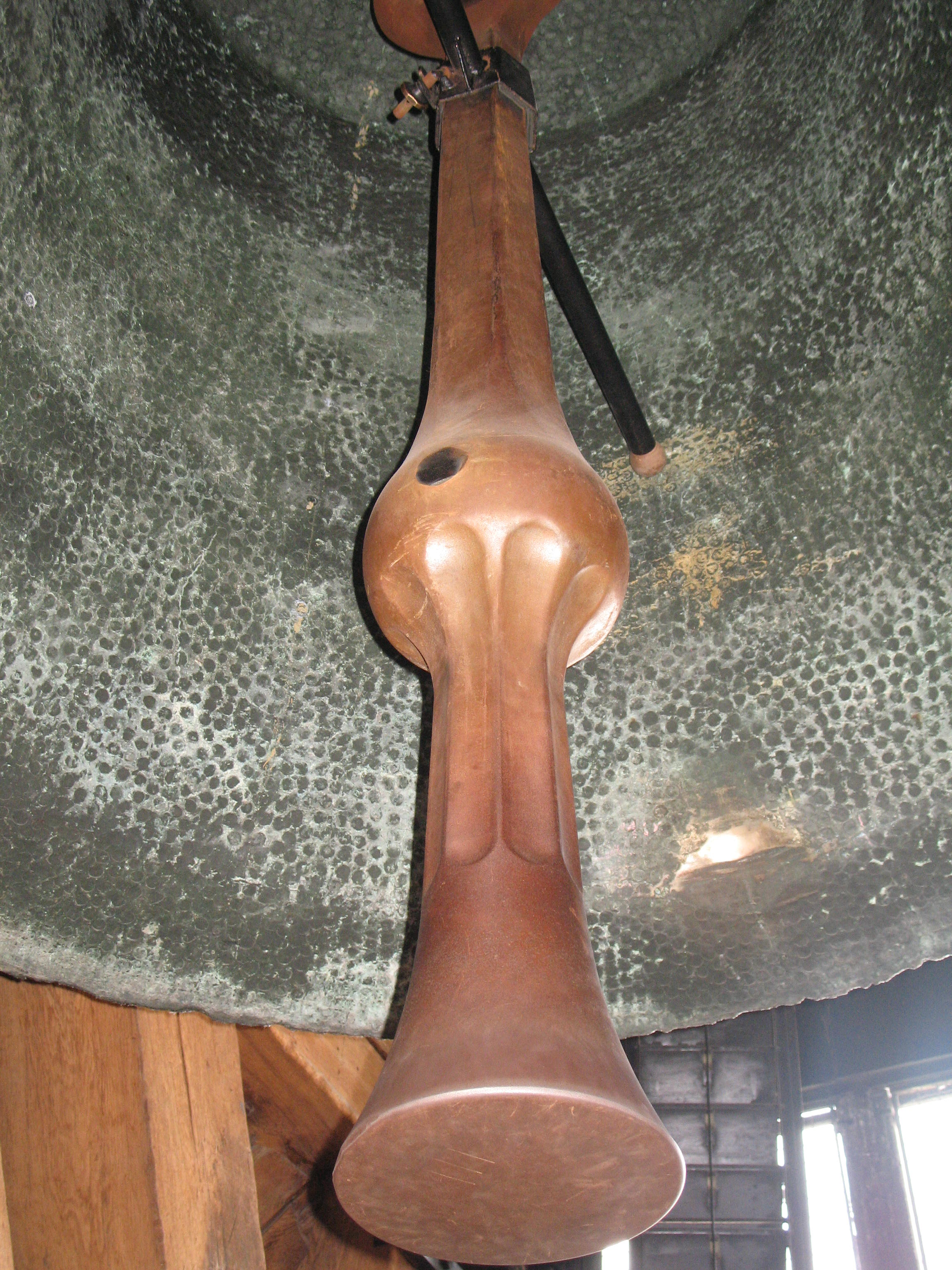
Clapper of the Sigismund Bell

The Sigismund Bell is operated manually by pulling ropes attached to its yoke. It takes 12 men, six on either side, to swing the bell. The task requires strength, coordination and caution. While swinging, the bell often pulls the ringers up from the floor; in the interwar period, one ringer was accidentally killed when the bell pushed him out of a window. In 1888, the cathedral chapter specified the duration of ringing at eight minutes, but the bell may toll for up to 20 minutes in certain cases, such as during a procession.

In the 16th century, the bell was rung by peasants from the village of Świątniki Górne, who also performed other chores in the cathedral. During the following several centuries, it was operated by members of the carpenters' guild. Since the mid-20th century, the privilege of ringing the bell has belonged to about 30 members of the Fraternity of Wawel Bell-Ringers (Bractwo Dzwonników na Wawelu). Bell-ringers are mostly members of Kraków intelligentsia and membership is often passed from father to son. As of 1998, there has been only one female bell-ringer.

A person who has participated in the ringing of the Sigismund Bell at least 50 times over the course of at least three years receives a badge with an image of the bell and the inscription: Dzwonnik Zygmunta ("Sigismund Bell-Ringer"). Honorary badges are occasionally awarded to people who never actually rang the bell. A unique, golden honorary badge was given to Pope John Paul II.

== Ringing dates ==
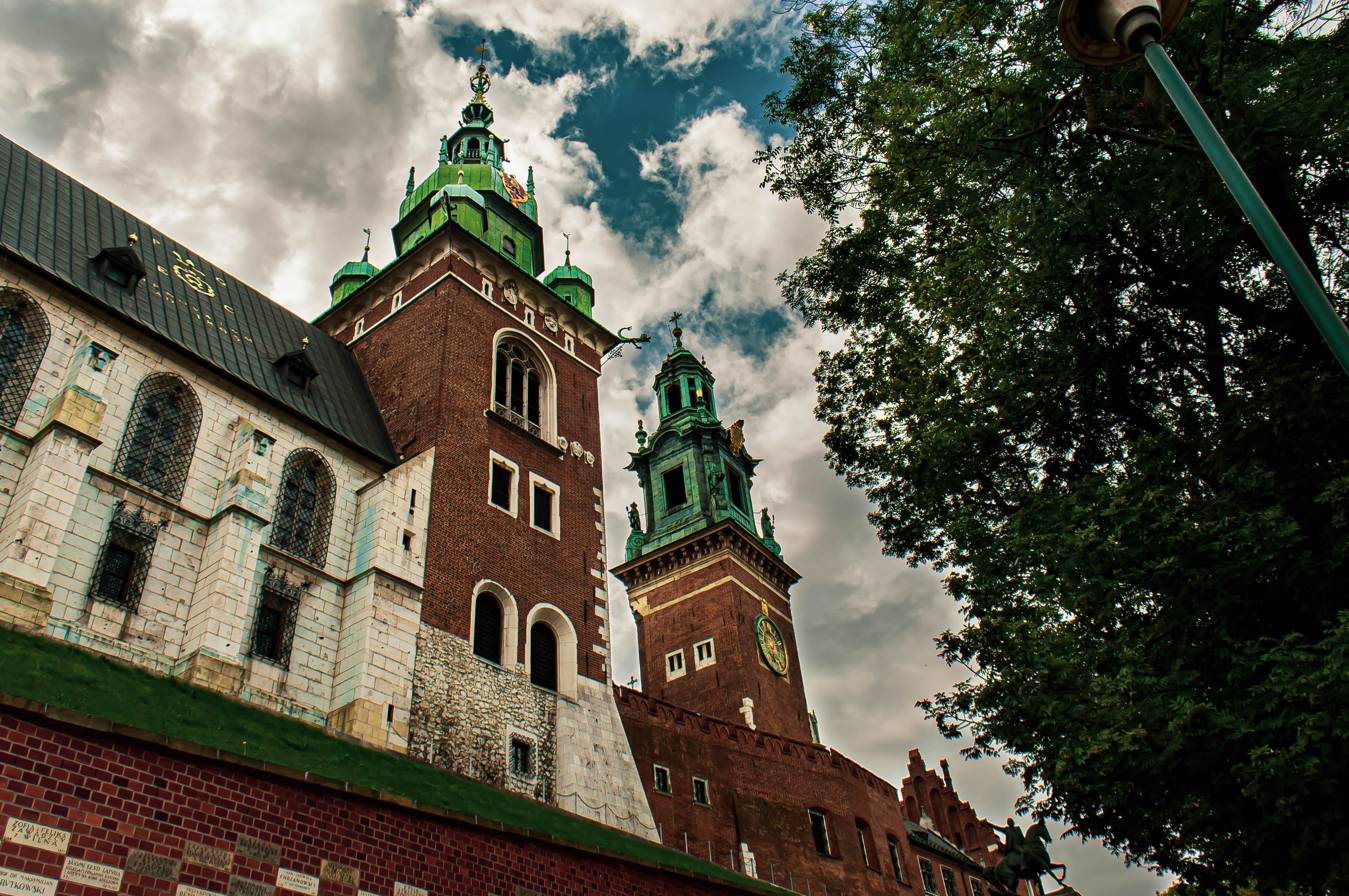
The Sigismund Tower of Wawel Cathedral on the left is where the bell hangs.

The bell regularly tolls on major Catholic holidays, Polish national holidays, and feast days of the patron saints of the bell, the cathedral, Kraków or all Poland. It also tolls on other special occasions at the discretion of the archbishop of Kraków.

Occasion	Date
Solemnity of Mary, Mother of God	1 January
Epiphany	6 January
Palm Sunday	movable
Holy Saturday	movable
Easter	movable
Easter Monday	movable
Divine Mercy Sunday	movable
Saint Sigismund's Day	2 May
Constitution Day; Day of Our Lady, the Queen of Poland	3 May
Saint Stanislaus' Day	8 May
Procession of Saint Stanislaus	movable
Ascension	movable
Pentecost	movable
Saint Hedwig's Day	8 June
Corpus Christi	movable
Feast of Saints Peter and Paul	29 June
Assumption; Polish Armed Forces Day	15 August
Saint Wenceslaus' Day	28 September
Saint John Paul II's Day	22 October
All Saints	1 November
All Souls' Day	2 November
Independence Day	11 November
Feast of Christ the King	movable
Immaculate Conception	8 December
Christmas Eve	24 December
Christmas	25 December
Second Day of Christmas	26 December
