= Żupnik =

A żupnik (from żupa, old Polish word for a salt mine) in Polish salt and metal mining between the 13th and 18th century was a manager which oversaw the operations of a mining district, often in the name of the king.

Żupnik was in charge of the Royal Wieliczka Salt Mine and the Bochnia Salt Mine in southern Poland, near the original capital city of Kraków of the Piast dynasty.

Notable żupniks include Jan Boner.
