= Wawel Cathedral =

Roman Catholic church in Kraków, Poland

Archcathedral Basilica of St. Stanislaus and St. Wenceslaus
- Bazylika archikatedralna św. Stanisława i św. Wacława (Polish)
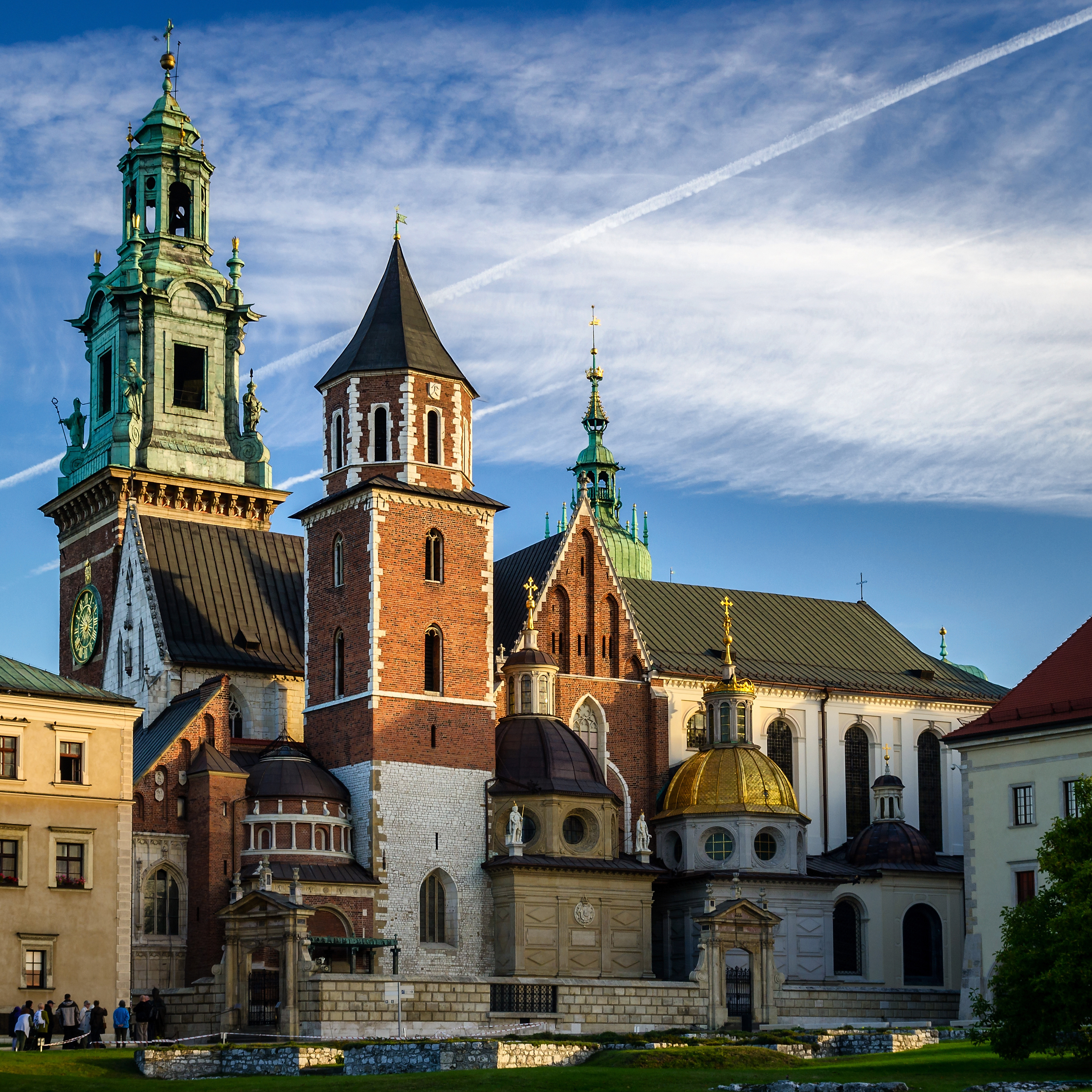
- Wawel Cathedral: Sigismund's Chapel (right, with a gold dome) and Vasa chapel (left)
- Archcathedral Basilica of St. Stanislaus and St. Wenceslaus
- 50°03′17″N 19°56′07″E
- Location: 1 Wawel; Kraków
- Country: Poland
- Denomination: Roman Catholic

History
- Status: Cathedral
- Dedication: Saint Stanislaus; Saint Wenceslaus

Architecture
- Functional status: Active
- Style: Romanesque, Gothic, Renaissance, Baroque, Neoclassical
- Completed: 11th century

Specifications
- Materials: Brick, stone

Administration
- Province: Archdiocese of Kraków

UNESCO World Heritage Site
- Type: Cultural
- Criteria: iv
- Designated: 1978
- Part of: Historic Centre of Kraków
- Reference no.: 29
- Region: Europe and North America

Historic Monument of Poland
- Designated: 1994-09-08
- Part of: Kraków historical city complex
- Reference no.: M.P. 1994 nr 50 poz. 418

The Archcathedral Basilica of Saint Stanislaus and Saint Wenceslaus (Polish: Bazylika archikatedralna św. Stanisława i św. Wacława), known colloquially as Wawel Cathedral (Polish: Katedra Wawelska), is a Catholic cathedral situated on Wawel Hill in Kraków, Poland. Nearly 1,000 years old, it is part of the Wawel Castle Complex and is a national sanctuary which served as the coronation site of Polish monarchs.

The current Gothic cathedral is the third edifice on this site; the first was constructed and destroyed in the 11th century and the second one, constructed in the 12th century, was destroyed by a fire in 1305. The construction of the existing church began in the 14th century on the orders of Bishop Nanker. Over time, the building was expanded by successive rulers resulting in its versatile and eclectic architectural composition. There are examples of Romanesque, Gothic, Renaissance, Baroque, Neoclassical and Neogothic elements in the cathedral's façade and interior. The exterior is adorned by side chapels and representative mausoleums, most notable being the golden-domed Sigismund's Chapel.

It is the official seat of the Archbishop of Kraków and of the Archdiocese of Kraków. A symbol of Polish statehood and faith, the cathedral hosts important religious events and annual celebrations. Karol Wojtyła, who in 1978 became Pope John Paul II, the day after his ordination to the priesthood offered his first Mass as a priest at the Wawel Crypt on 2 November 1946, and was ordained Kraków's auxiliary bishop in the cathedral on 28 September 1958.

== History ==
=== First church ===
The cathedral traces its origins to the late 10th century, shortly after the Christianization of Poland under Duke Mieszko I in 966. The earliest church on Wawel Hill was likely a wooden or modest stone rotunda structure serving the newly established Christian community; the oldest remnant of that building is the Rotunda of the Virgin Mary from circa 970. Archaeological investigations have revealed traces of pre-Romanesque foundations beneath the present structure, indicating early efforts to create a permanent ecclesiastical center associated with the Piast dynasty’s emerging authority. Around the year 1000, following the establishment of the Diocese of Kraków at the Congress of Gniezno, construction commenced on the first stone cathedral, known conventionally as "Wawel I". Built in the Romanesque style, this structure symbolized Poland's integration into the Latin (Western) Christian world. It was destroyed during the raid of Bretislav I, Duke of Bohemia, in 1038/1039.

=== Second church ===
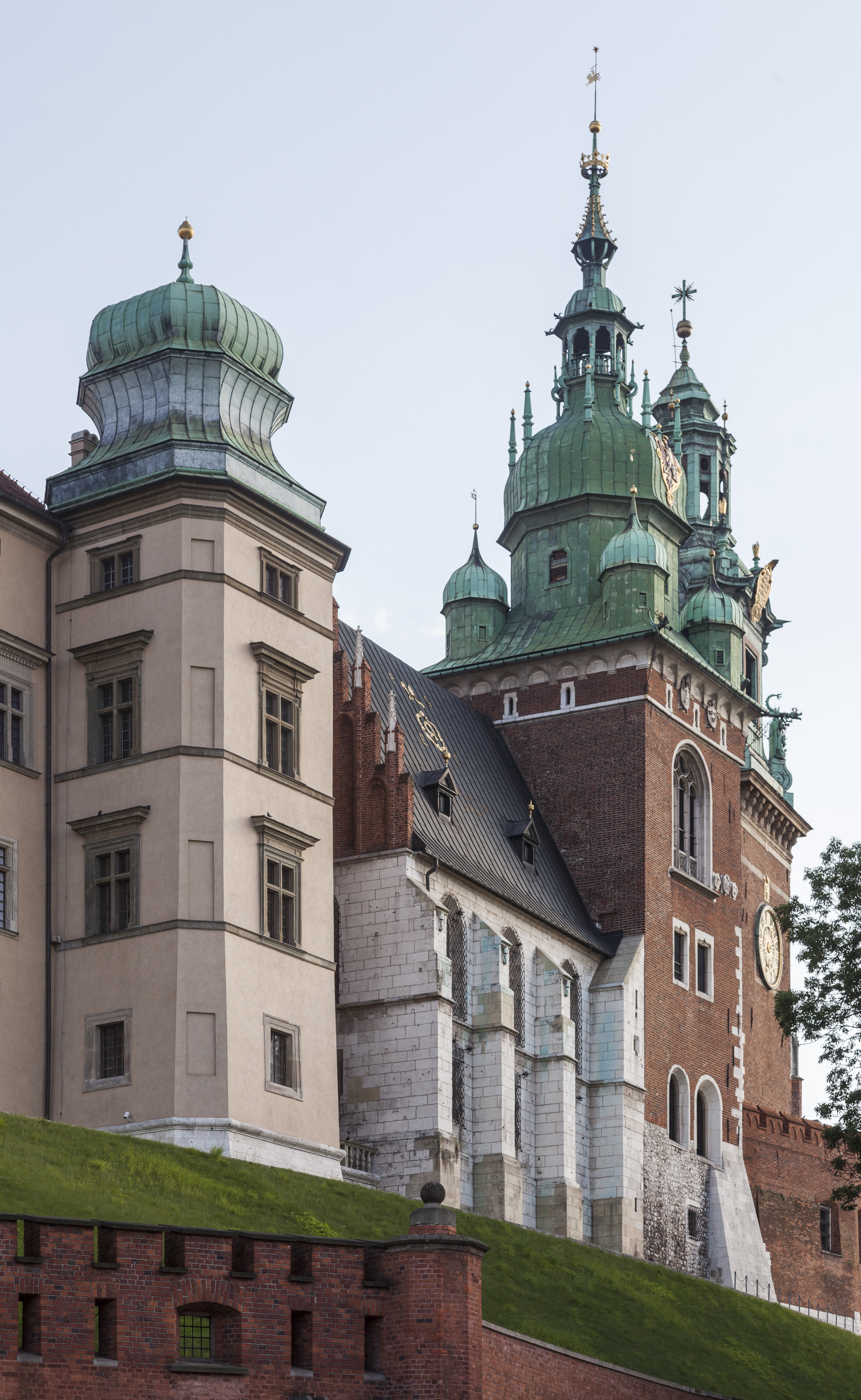
View of the Sigismund Tower and the adjacent treasury in white stone.

Duke Władysław I Herman initiated the construction of a second, more substantial Romanesque cathedral, known as "Wawel II", to replace the earlier structure. This edifice, completed at the turn of the 11th and 12th centuries (consecrated in 1142), featured stone walls, a triple-apsed east end, and crypts typical of contemporary Central European ecclesiastical architecture. Remnants of this phase, including the Crypt of Saint Leonard, survive beneath the current cathedral and constitute some of the most important examples of early medieval architecture in Poland. Among the notable early bishops, Lambert Suła (in office c. 1070–1082) likely oversaw the organization of the first permanent cathedral chapter. The second cathedral was destroyed by fire circa 1305, prompting a major architectural transformation under King Ladislaus the Short (Władysław I). His reign marked the reunification of Poland after a period of political fragmentation, and the construction of a new Gothic cathedral symbolized both dynastic legitimacy and renewal. Bishop Nanker (in office 1320–1326) played a crucial role in the undertaking. A distinguished churchman educated in Prague, Nanker supported the monarch’s efforts and is associated with the consecration of the new cathedral in 1320, which coincided with the coronation of Ladislaus.

=== Third church ===
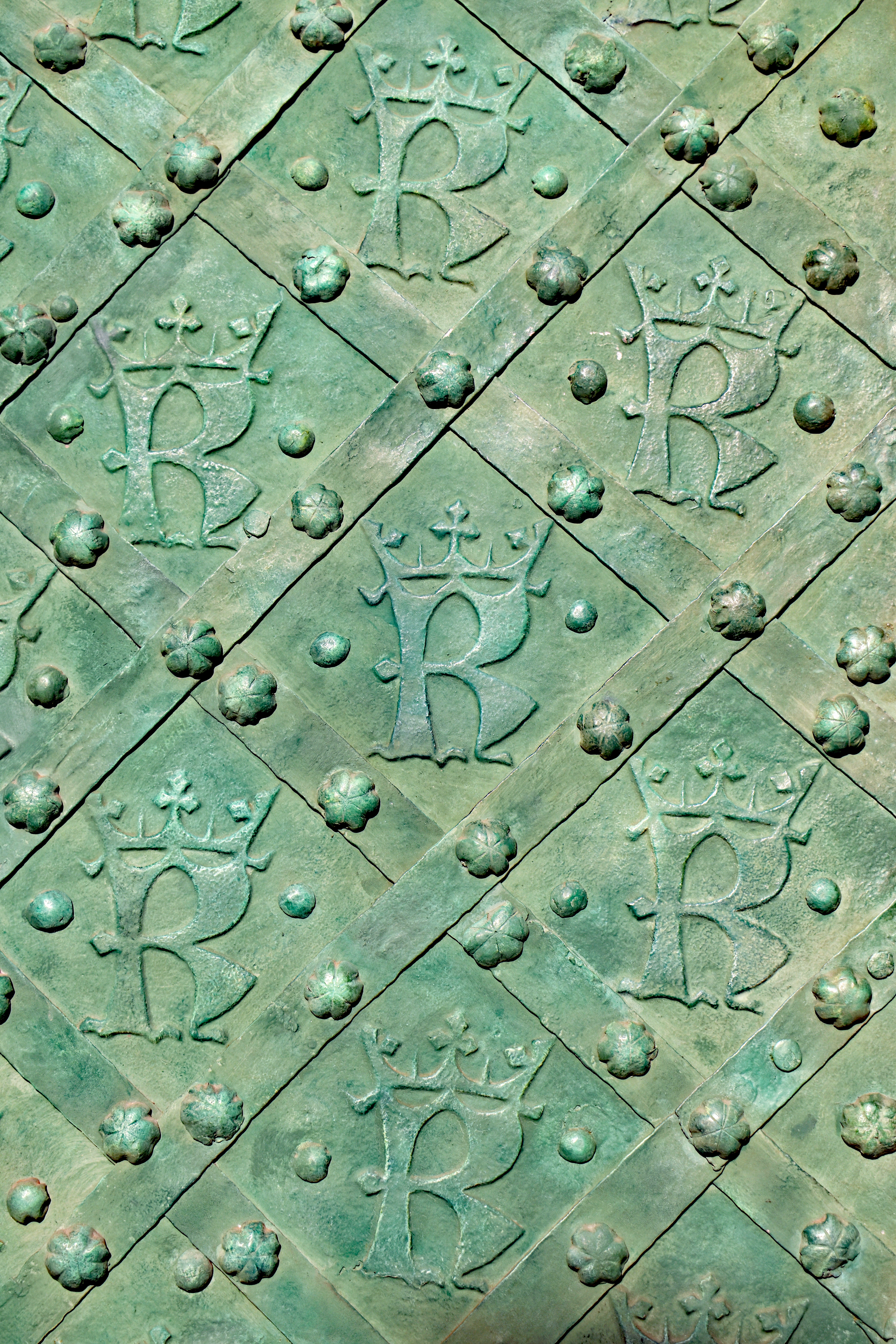
Doors of King Casimir III the Great, with the symbol "K".

The third cathedral, "Wawel III", adopted the Gothic style prevalent across Europe in the 14th century. Constructed primarily of brick and limestone, it featured rib-vaulted ceilings, pointed arches, and a Latin cross plan. The main nave, side aisles, and chancel were completed by the mid-14th century, while additional chapels and towers were added over successive centuries. The cathedral was consecrated in 1364 during the reign of King Casimir III the Great. From 1320 until the final coronation in 1764, Wawel Cathedral functioned as the ceremonial site for the investiture of Polish monarchs. Each coronation was conducted before the high altar, with the regalia of the Polish Crown kept within the cathedral treasury. The cathedral’s crypts and chapels served as the burial place for Polish kings, queens, and prominent national figures. Some of the Piasts as well as Jagiellonian kings are interred within its vaults. Over time, this expanded to include military leaders, poets, and statesmen, transforming the site into a national pantheon. The artistic quality of the sarcophagi and tomb monuments constitutes an invaluable record of funerary art from the Gothic through the Baroque periods.

=== 17th and 18th century ===
The 17th and 18th centuries witnessed the addition of Baroque chapels and altars, reflecting the Counter-Reformation’s aesthetic and theological impulses. The Vasa Chapel and other royal commissions enriched the cathedral’s visual program. These additions, while altering the Gothic austerity of the interior, integrated the building into the broader European artistic currents of the Baroque era. The Swedish invasion of 1655–1657, known as the Swedish Deluge, brought disruption and damage to Wawel Hill. The cathedral, though spared from complete destruction, suffered from looting and structural degradation. The postwar years witnessed efforts to restore its dignity and functionality. Bishop Andrzej Trzebicki (in office 1658–1679) and his successors initiated repairs to the roof, towers, and interior furnishings. Institutionally, the cathedral remained a central node in the archdiocesan administration, with the cathedral chapter exercising considerable influence in both ecclesiastical and civic affairs. The bishops of this period, including Jan Aleksander Lipski (bishop 1732–1746) and Kajetan Sołtyk (1759–1788), continued to sponsor restoration and embellishment projects.

=== 19th and 20th century ===
Schematic of Wawel Hill showing the location of the Wawel Cathedral

The political decline of the Polish–Lithuanian Commonwealth and the Partitions of Poland at the close of the 18th century resulted in the loss of Kraków’s status as a royal capital and the cathedral’s state functions diminished. It assumed a new role as a symbol of national identity under foreign rule. During the 19th century, it became the burial site for national heroes such as Tadeusz Kościuszko, Prince Józef Poniatowski, and the Romantic poet Adam Mickiewicz. Its preservation during Austrian rule was due largely to ecclesiastical custodianship and patriotic sentiment among Kraków’s citizens. Extensive restoration campaigns were carried out under the guidance of architects such as Zygmunt Hendel and Sławomir Odrzywolski, who sought to recover the building’s medieval character while stabilizing its structure. In the 20th century, the cathedral’s symbolic importance was reinforced by the pastoral activities of Karol Wojtyła, later Pope John Paul II, who served as Archbishop of Kraków from 1964 to 1978. The building survived both World Wars with minimal structural damage and remains an active site of worship and national commemoration.

== Interior ==
The cathedral comprises a nave with aisles, transepts with aisles, a choir with double aisles, and an apse with ambulatory and radiating chapels. The main altar, located in the apse, was founded about 1650 by Bishop Piotr Gembicki and created by Giovanni Battista Gisleni. The altar painting of Crucified Christ by Marcin Blechowski is from the 17th century. Over the main altar stands a tall canopy of black marble supported by four pillars, designed by Giovanni Battista Trevano and Matteo Castelli between 1626 and 1629. Underneath the canopy is placed a silver coffin of national patron Stanislaus of Szczepanów (also Stanisław Szczepanowski) created between 1669 and 1671 after the previous one (donated in 1512 by King Sigismund I the Old) was stolen by the Swedes in 1655.

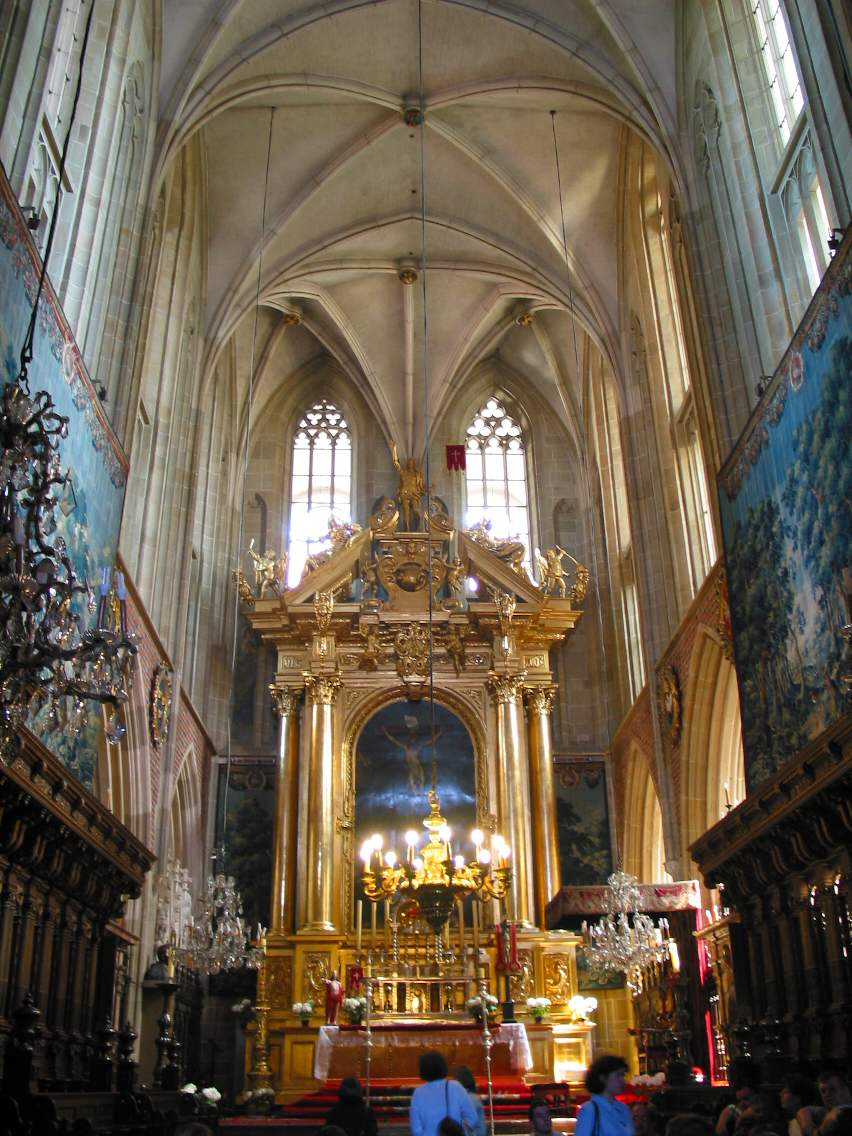
The main gilded altar established in circa 1650

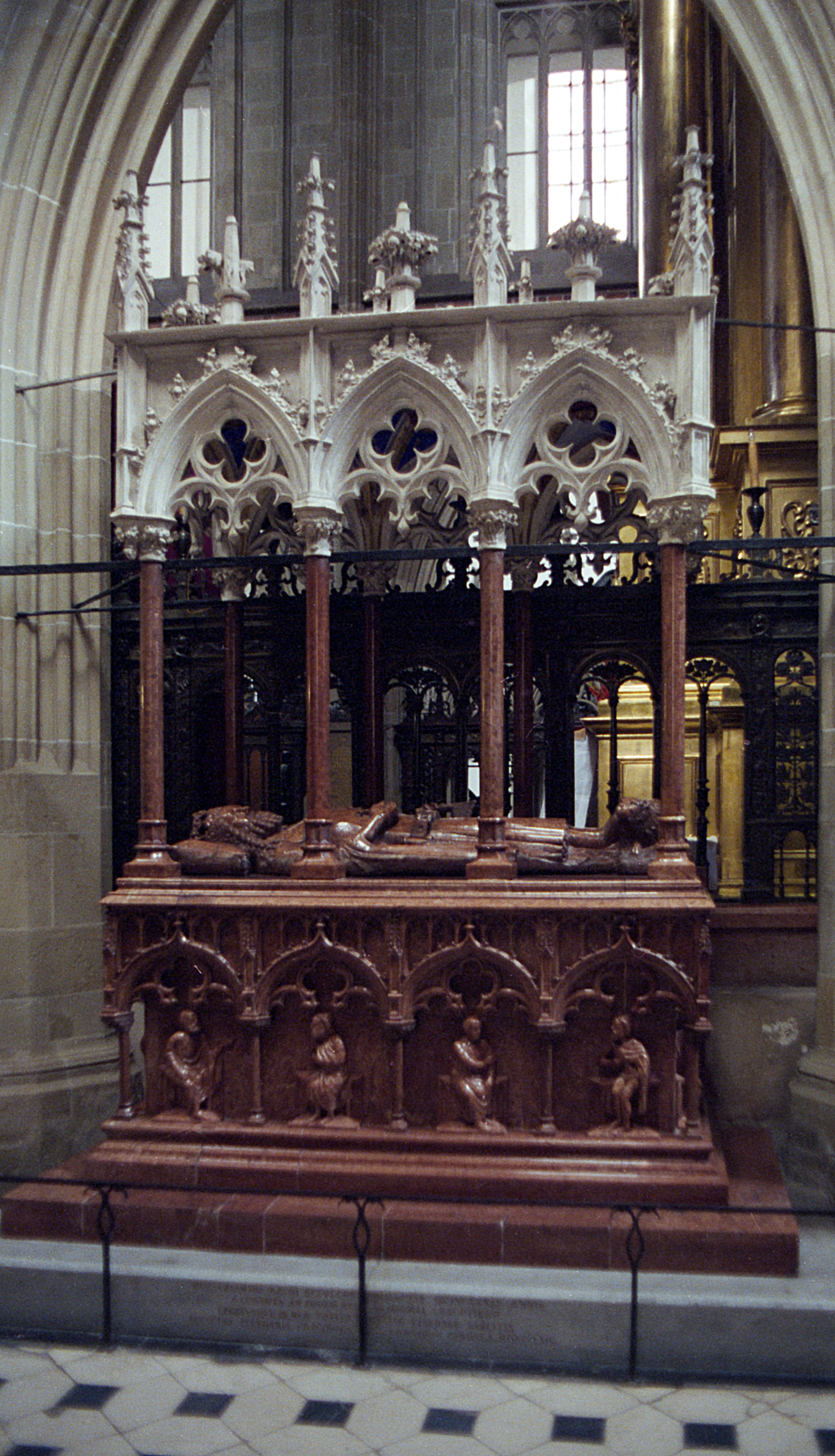
Tomb of king Casimir III the Great

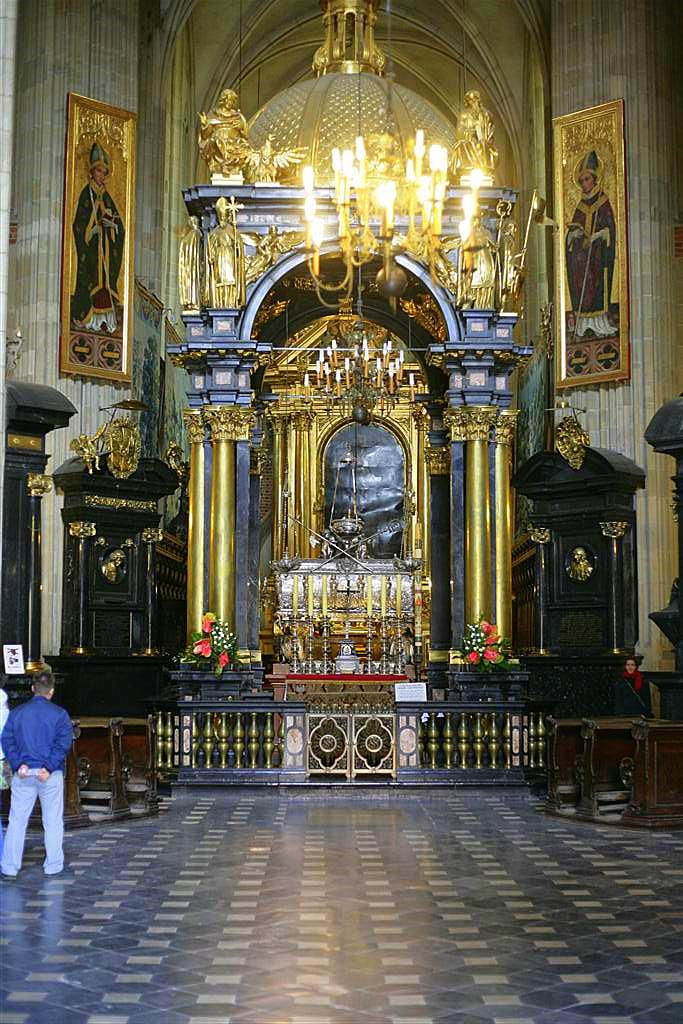
Canopied sarcophagus of St. Stanislaus

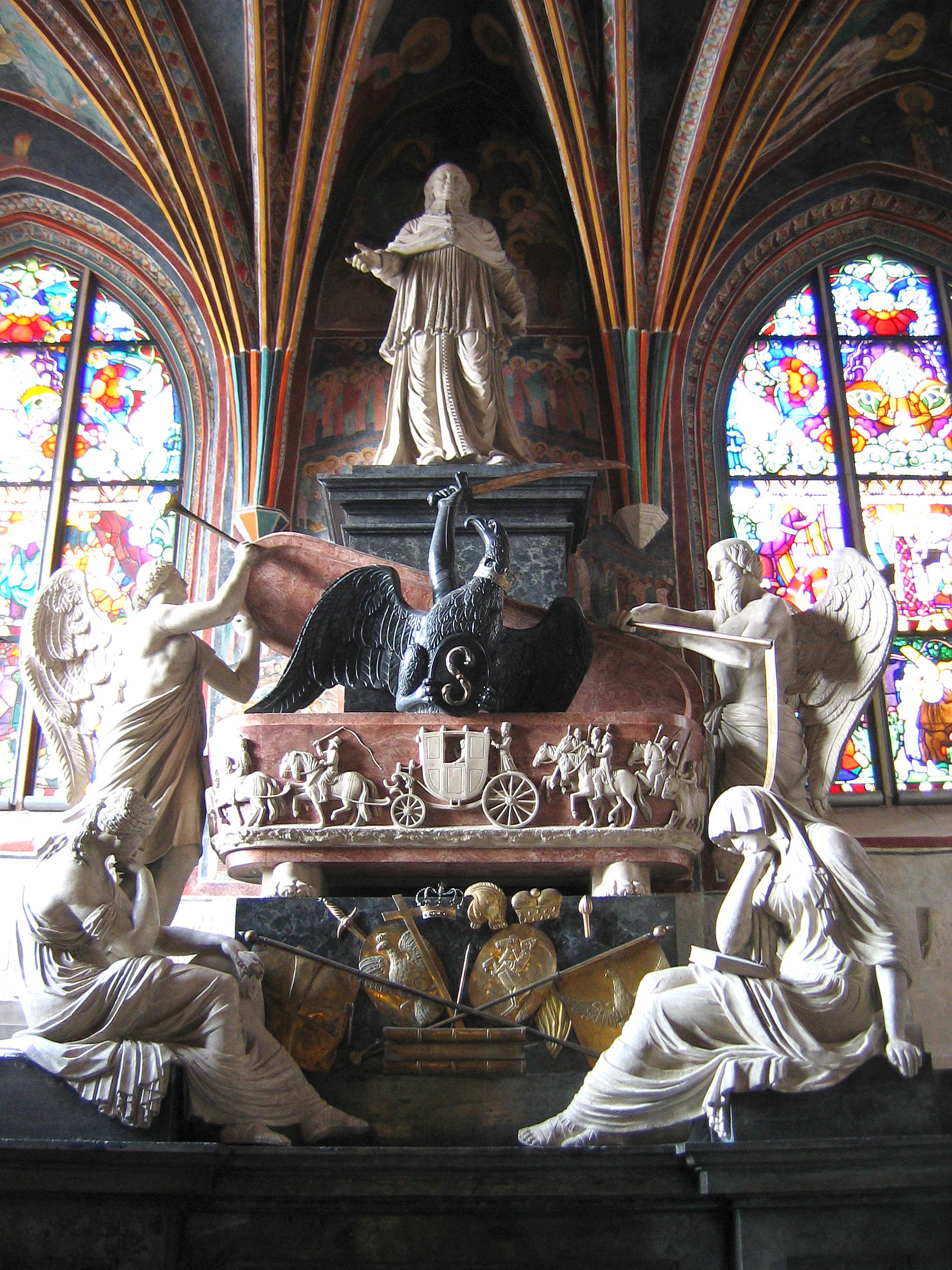
Holy Cross Chapel

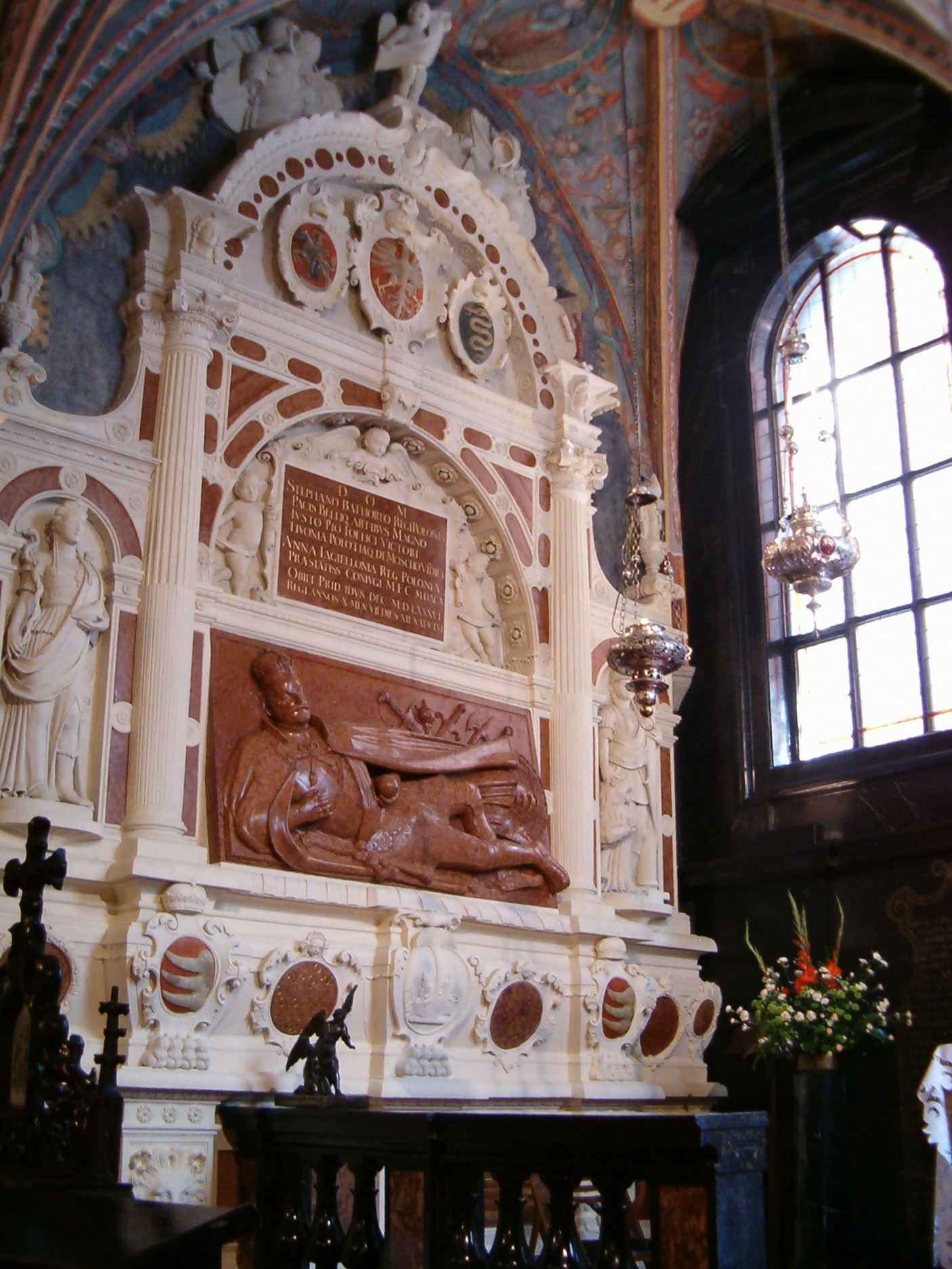
King Stephen Báthory's tomb monument

=== Sigismund's and Vasa Chapels ===
Sigismund's Chapel, or Zygmunt Chapel (Kaplica Zygmuntowska), adjoining the southern wall of the cathedral, is one of the most notable pieces of architecture in Kraków and perhaps "the purest example of Renaissance architecture outside Italy." Financed by Sigismund I the Old, it was built between 1517 and 1533 by Bartolommeo Berrecci, a Florentine Renaissance architect, who spent most of his career in Poland. The chapel features a gilded dome, Tuscan pilasters, and elaborate sculptural ornamentation. It houses the tombs of its founder and those of his children, King Sigismund II Augustus and Anna Jagiellon. Their descendant, Sigismund III Vasa, ordered the construction of a near-identical domed chapel at a larger but simpler scale, which was subsequently fitted with black marble.

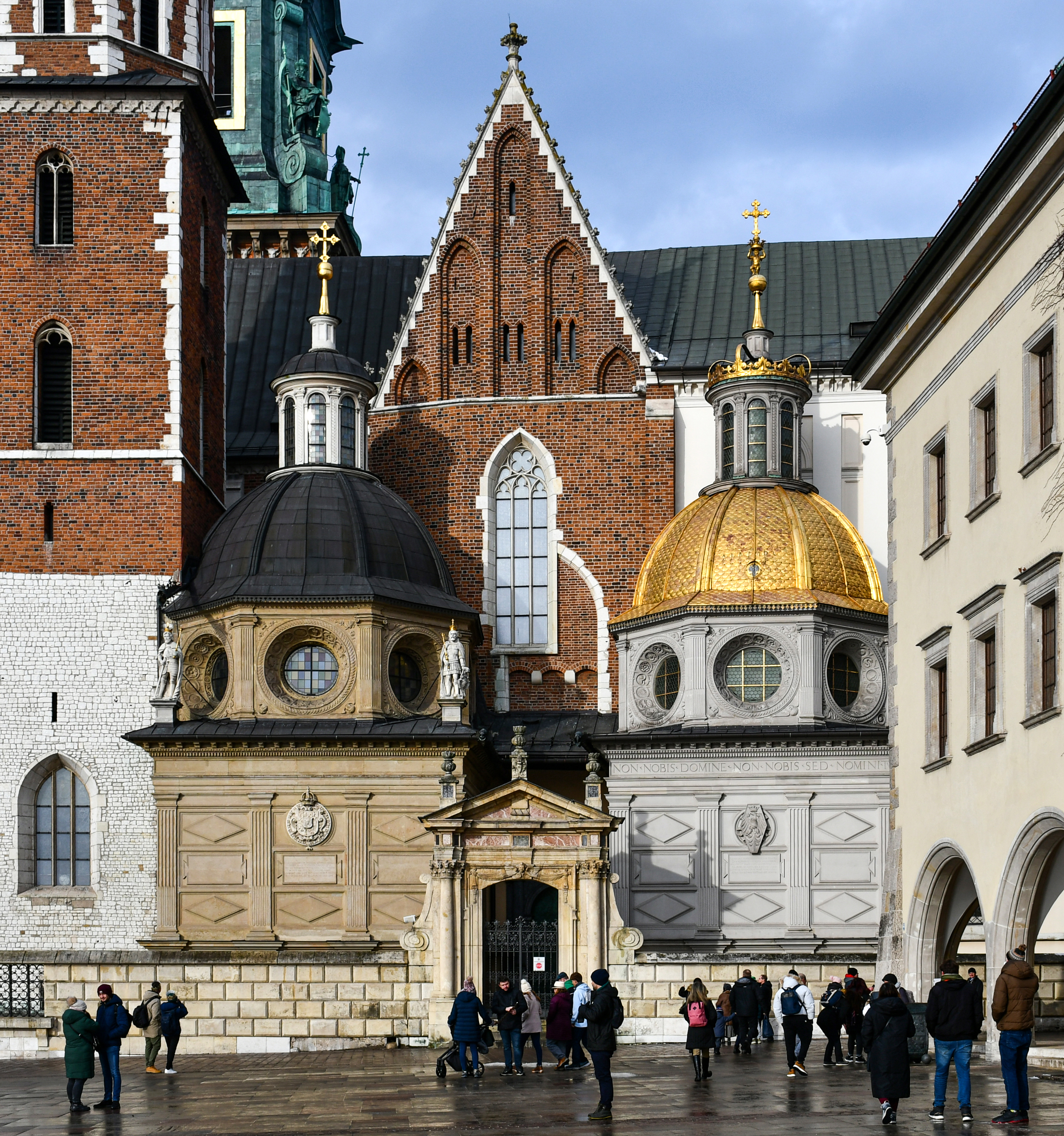
Sigismund's Chapel (right) and the Vasa Chapel (left)

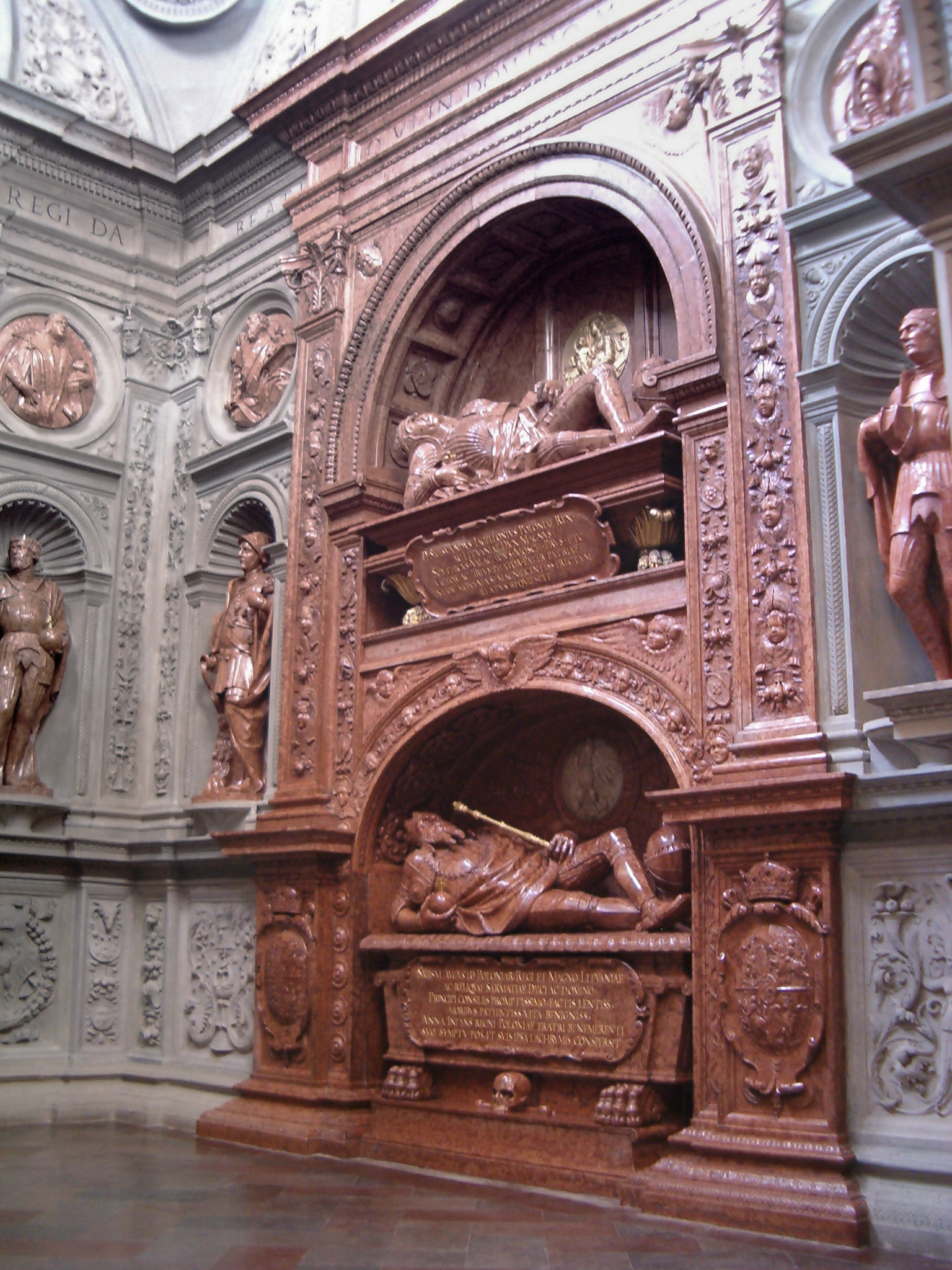
Sarcophagi of Sigismund I and his son Sigismund II Augustus

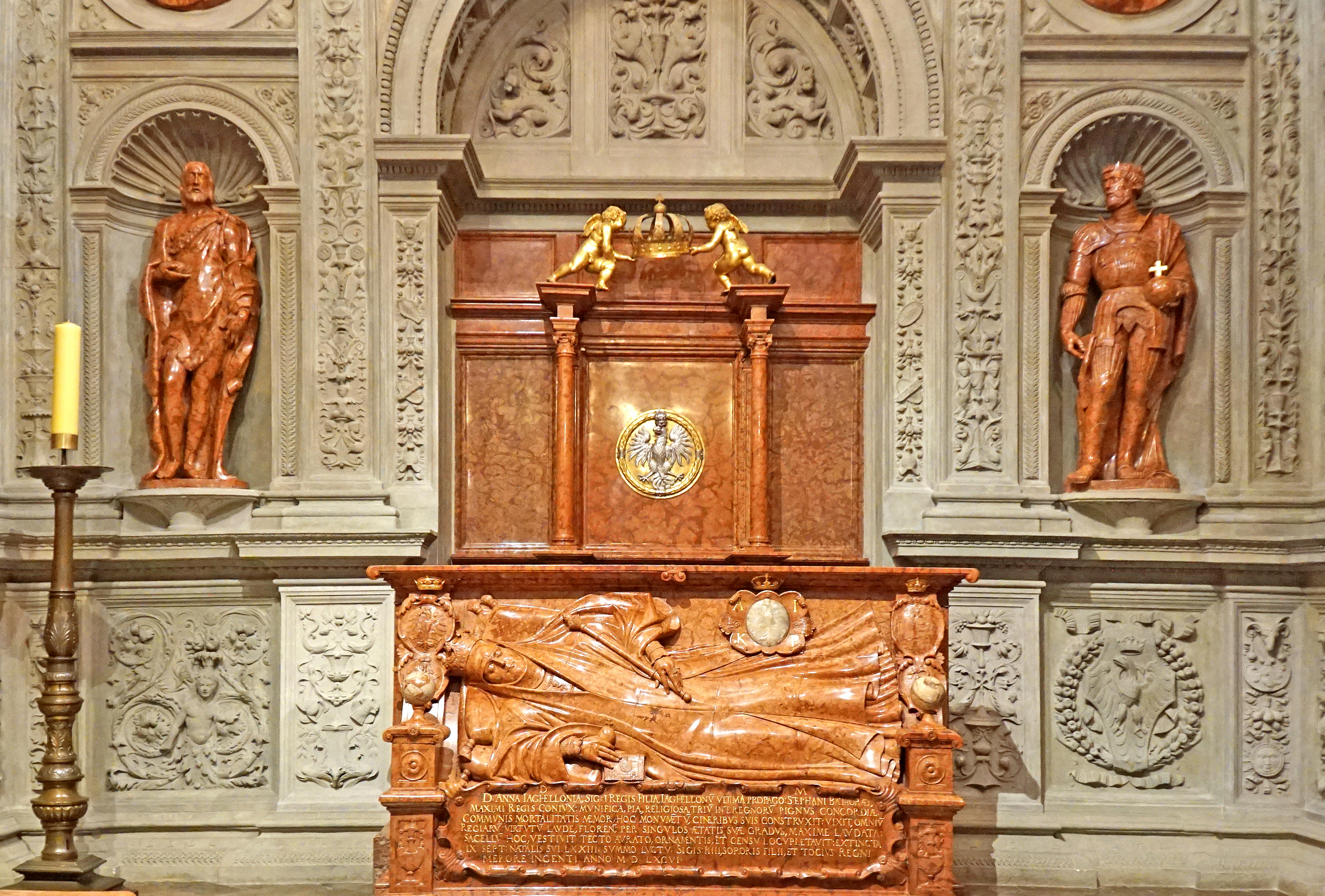
Tombstone of Anna Jagiellon inside the Sigismund Chapel

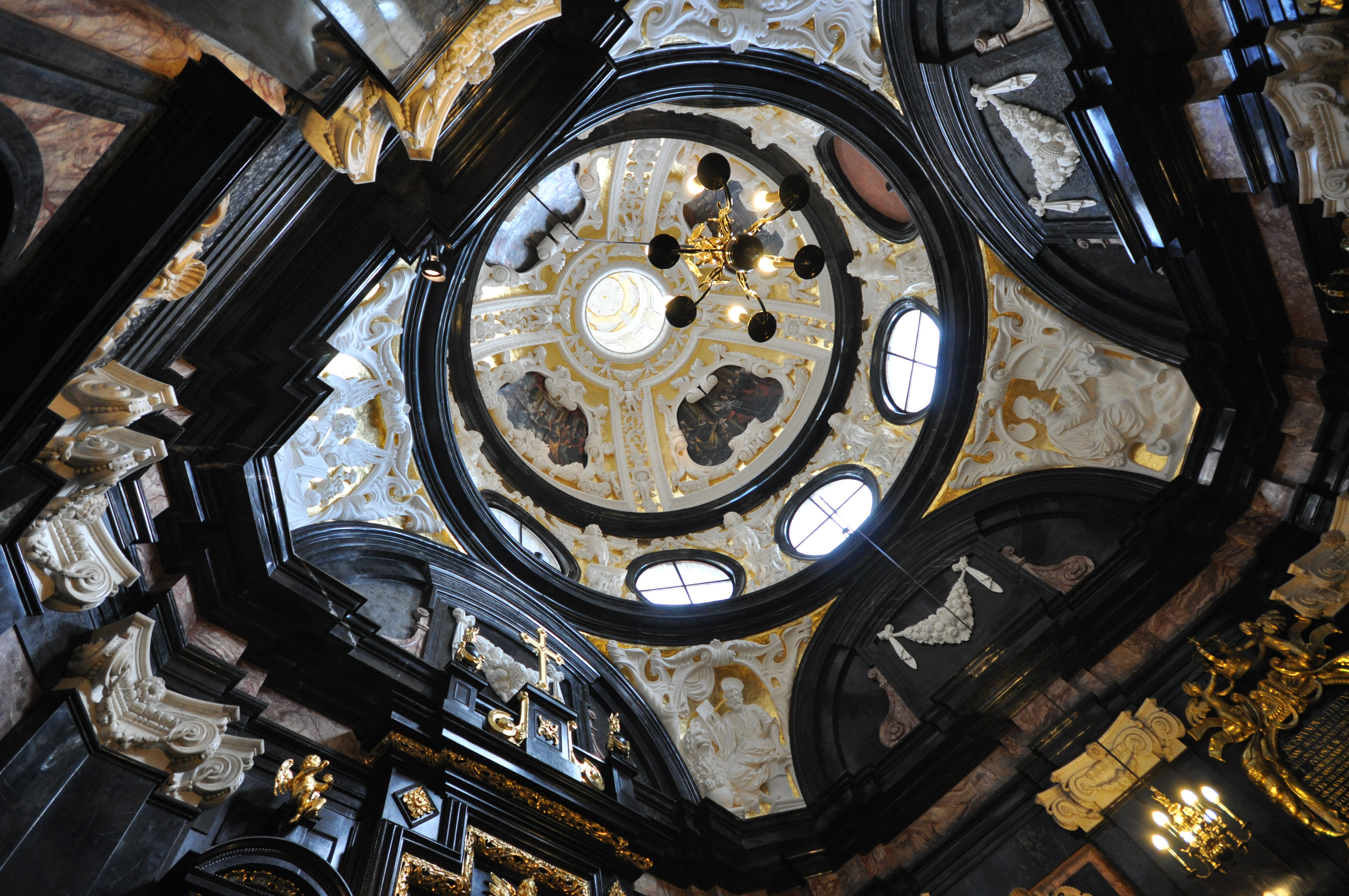
Dome of the Vasa Chapel

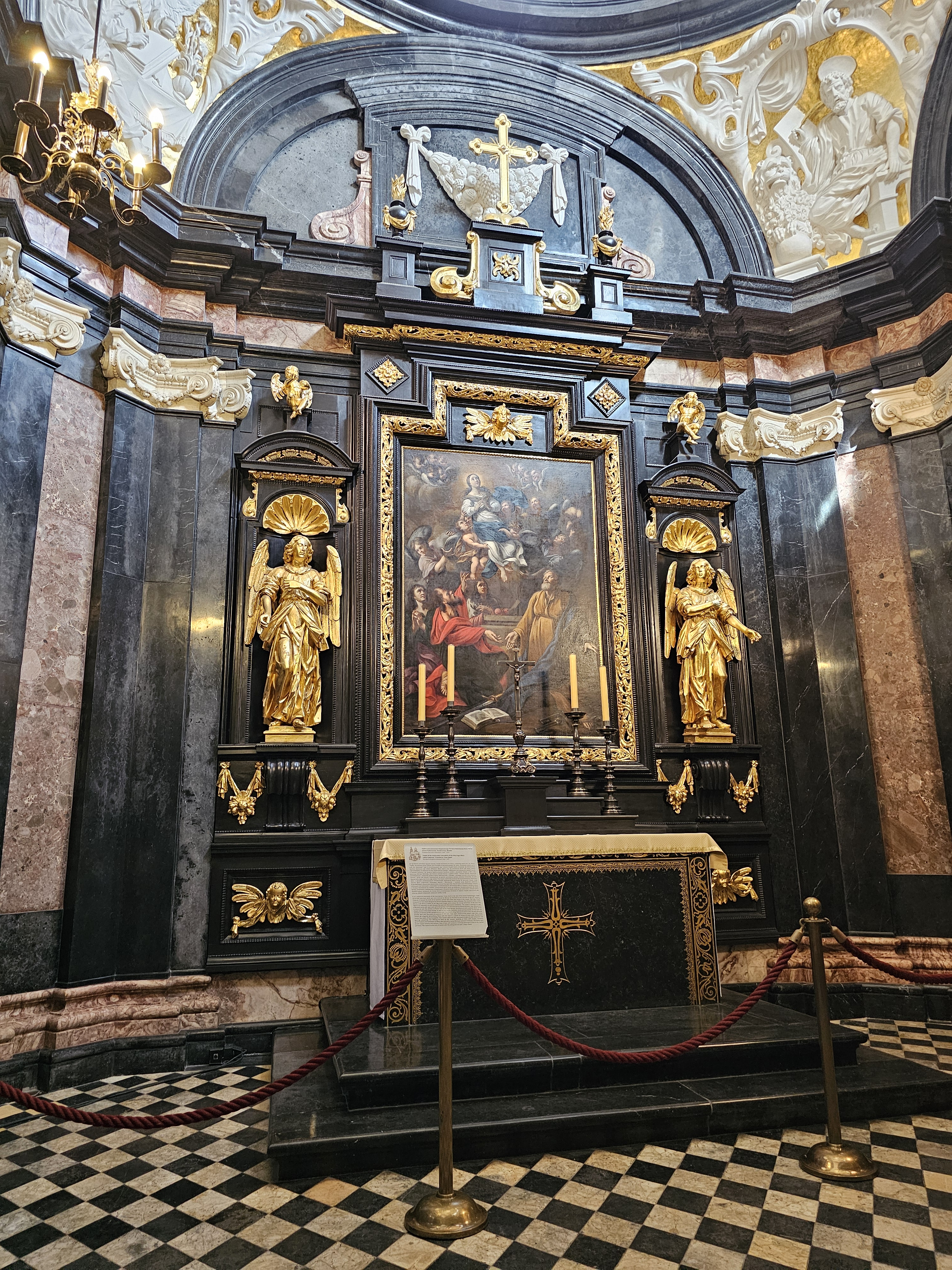
Vasa Chapel altar

=== Sigismund Bell ===
Installed in 1521 in the Sigismund Tower, the Sigismund Bell (Dzwon Zygmunt) remains one of Europe’s largest bells. Cast from bronze and weighing nearly 13 tons, it was funded by King Sigismund I and bears inscriptions commemorating his reign. The bell is sounded only on occasions of national importance, major religious feasts, and state anniversaries.

== Royal chapels and crypts ==
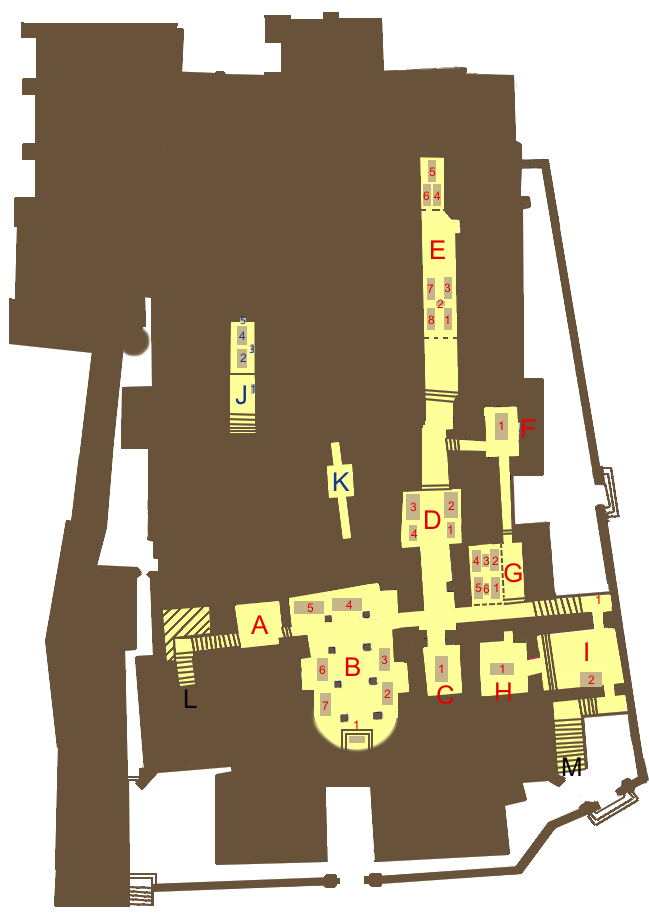
Burial chambers beneath Wawel Cathedral: A-I Royal Crypts (B St. Leonard's Crypt), J Crypt of National Poets, K Crypt of the Archbishops.

The Wawel Cathedral has been the main burial site for Polish monarchs since the 14th century. As such, it has been significantly extended and altered over time as individual rulers have added multiple burial chapels.

The crypts beneath the Wawel Cathedral hold the tombs of Polish kings, national heroes, generals and revolutionaries, including rulers of the Polish–Lithuanian Commonwealth such as John III Sobieski and his consort Marie Casimire (Maria Kazimiera); the remains of Tadeusz Kościuszko, the leader of a Polish national insurrection and Brigadier General in the American Revolutionary War; Władysław Sikorski, Prime Minister of the Polish Government in Exile and Commander-in-Chief of the Polish Armed Forces; Marshal Józef Piłsudski, founder of the Second Polish Republic. Pope John Paul II celebrated his first mass in St. Leonard's Crypt and considered being buried at the Wawel Cathedral also at one point in time.

Two national bards, Adam Mickiewicz (laid to rest there in 1890) and Juliusz Słowacki (1927), are buried at this site.

== Notable burials ==
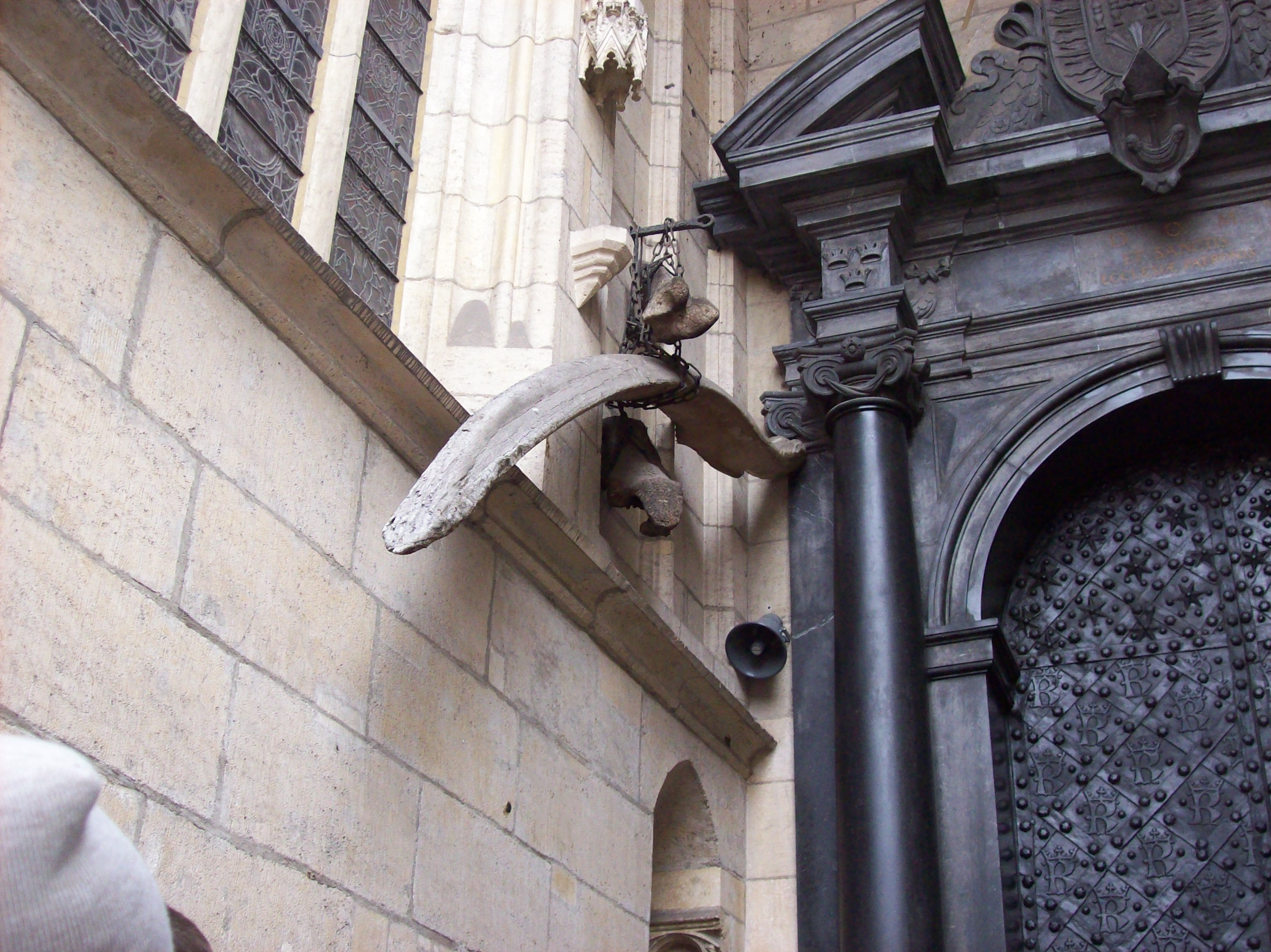
A purported dragon bone hanging outside of Wawel Cathedral

Monarchs
- Władysław I the Elbow-high
- Casimir III the Great
- Jadwiga
- Władysław II Jagiełło
- Casimir IV
- John I Albert
- Sigismund I the Old
- Sigismund II Augustus
- Stephen
- Anna Jagiellonka
- Sigismund III
- Władysław IV
- John II Casimir
- Michael
- John III Sobieski
- Augustus II the Strong

Saints
- Stanislaus the Martyr
- Jadwiga of Poland
Others
- Adam Stefan Sapieha
- Tadeusz Kościuszko
- Józef Piłsudski
- Władysław Sikorski
- Józef Poniatowski
- Adam Mickiewicz
- Lech Kaczyński and Maria Kaczyńska
- Juliusz Słowacki
- Cyprian Norwid (soil from his grave in France)

== See also ==
- List of Gothic Cathedrals in Europe
- Gniezno Cathedral
- Polish Crown Jewels
- Poznań Cathedral
- Royal coronations in Poland
- The Royal Road in Kraków

- Sigismund Bell
- Smocza Jama
- St. John's Cathedral, Warsaw
- Szczerbiec
- Tomb of Casimir IV Jagiellon
- Wawel Dragon
