= Eberhard Rosemberger =

German renaissance mason or architect

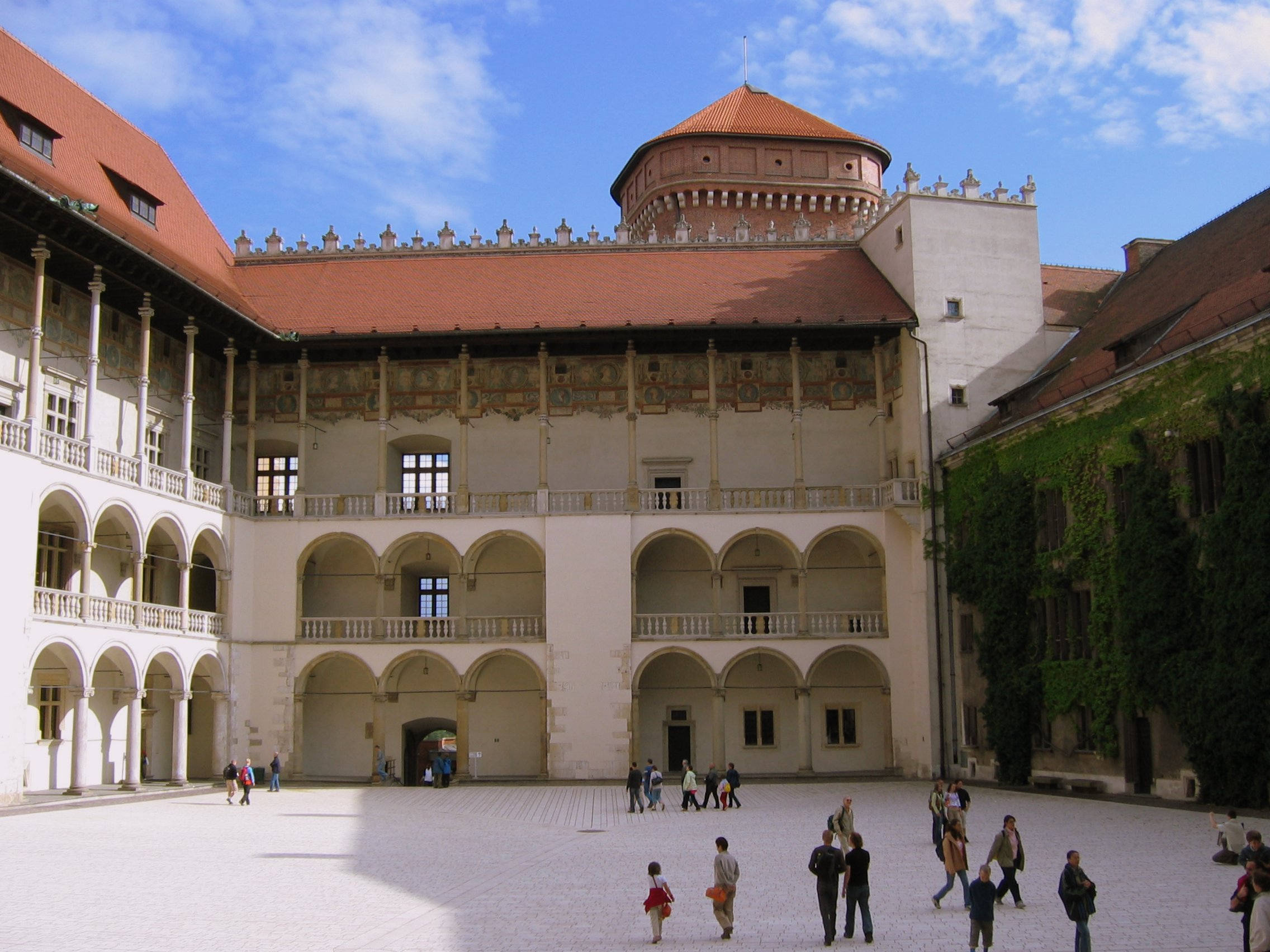
Eberhard Rosemberger and Francesco Fiorentino - Wawel, Kraków

Eberhard Rosemberger (?-1527) was a German renaissance mason or architect from Kraków, who was born in Koblenz. Together with Francesco Fiorentino, he rebuilt the Wawel Royal Castle in Kraków under the rule of Alexander of Poland after it burned down in 1499.
