= Sigismund's Chapel =

Funerary chapel at the Wawel Cathedral

Coordinates: 50°03′17″N 19°56′08″E

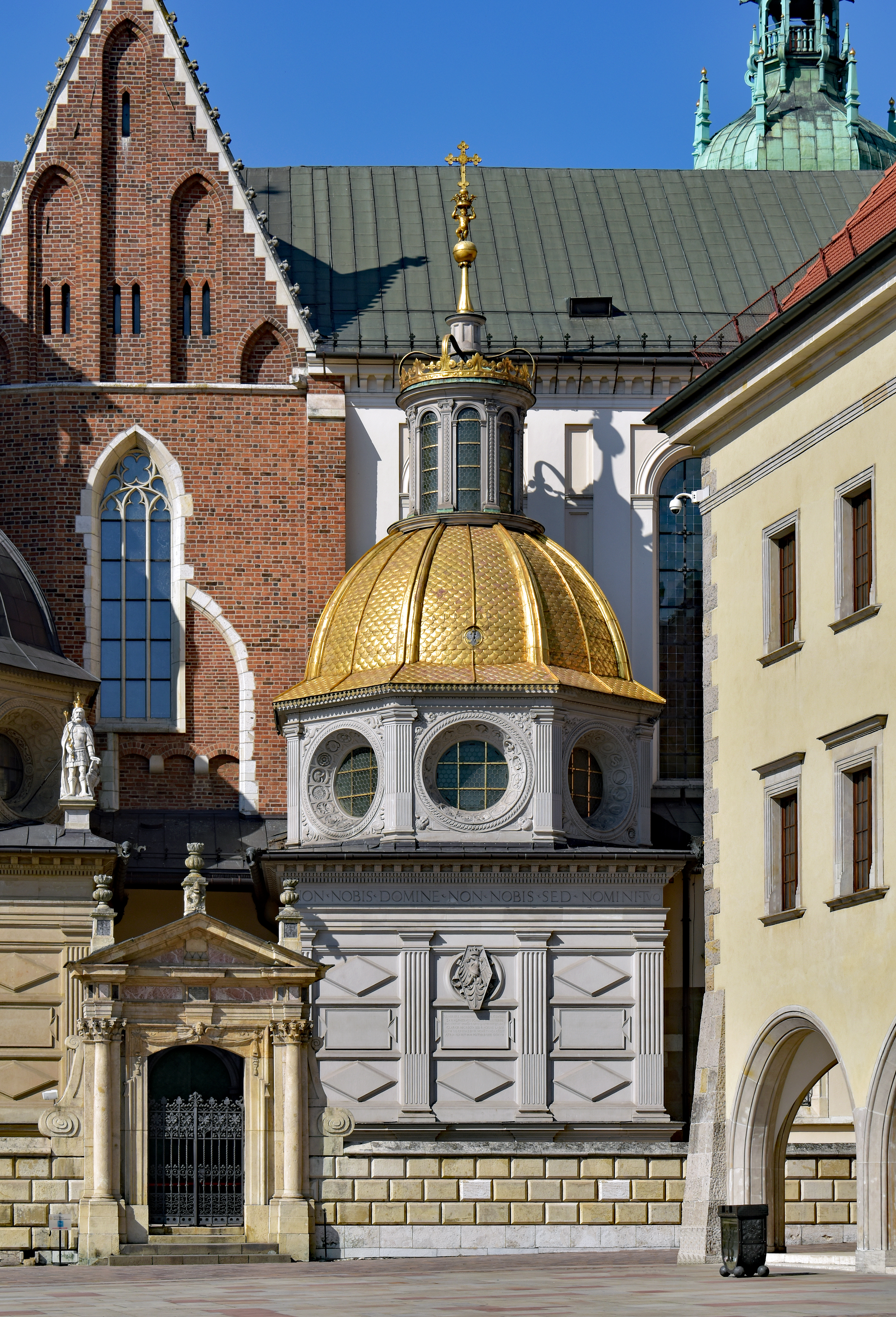
Sigismund's Chapel (1519–1533)

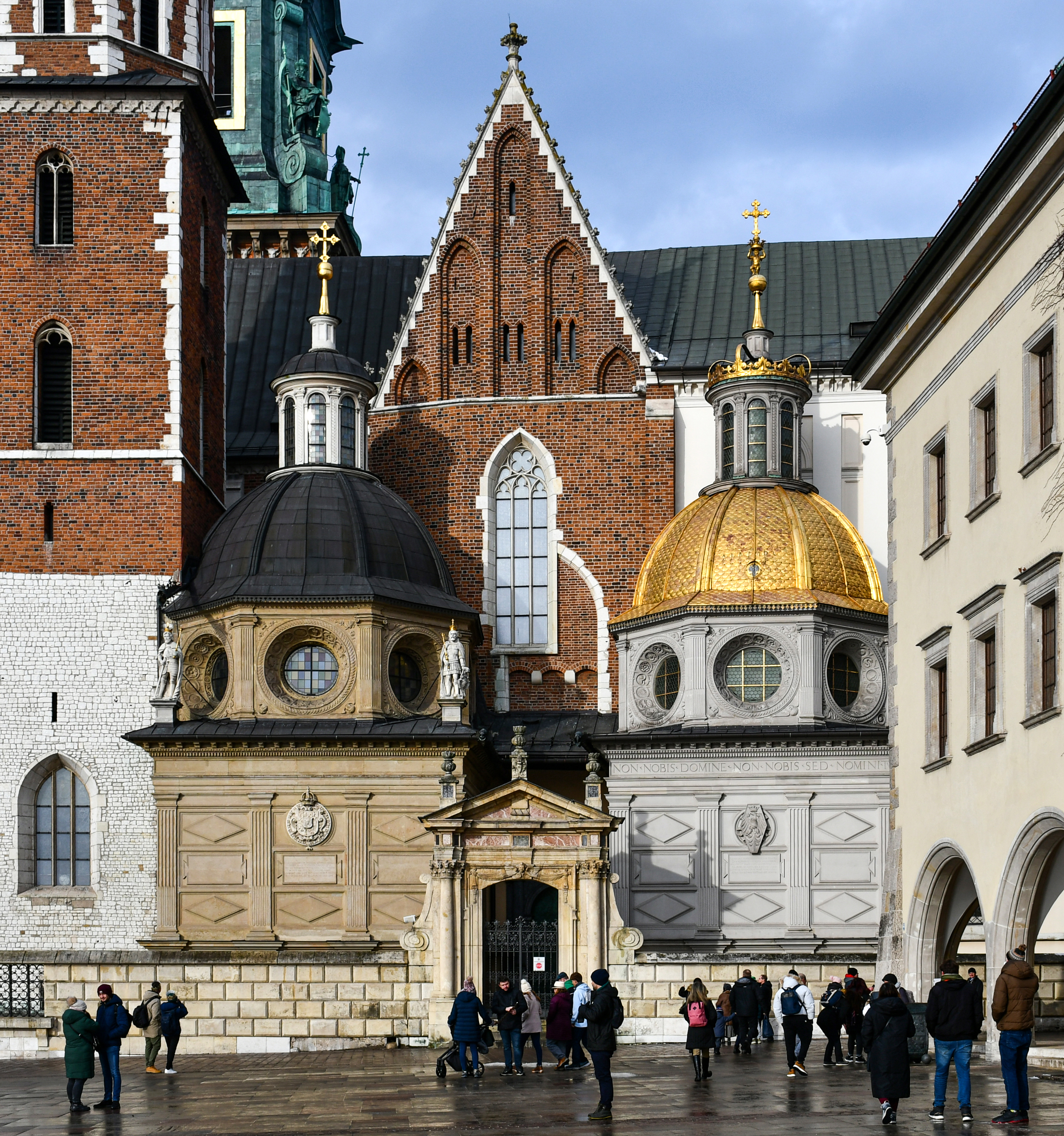
Sigismund's Chapel (right) and the later-period Vasa Chapel (left)

Sigismund's Chapel (Polish: kaplica Zygmuntowska) is a royal chapel of the Wawel Cathedral in Kraków, Poland. Built as a funerary chapel for the last members of the Jagiellonian Dynasty, it has been hailed by many art historians as "the most beautiful example of the Tuscan Renaissance north of the Alps". Financed by King Sigismund I the Old, it was built in 1519–33 by Italian architect Bartolomeo Berrecci.

A square-based chapel with a golden dome houses the tombs of its founder King Sigismund, as well as King Sigismund II Augustus and Anna Jagiellon. The inner sculptures, stuccos and paintings were designed by some of the most renowned artists of the age, including the architect Berrecci himself, Georg Pencz, Santi Gucci and Hermann Vischer.

== Gallery ==
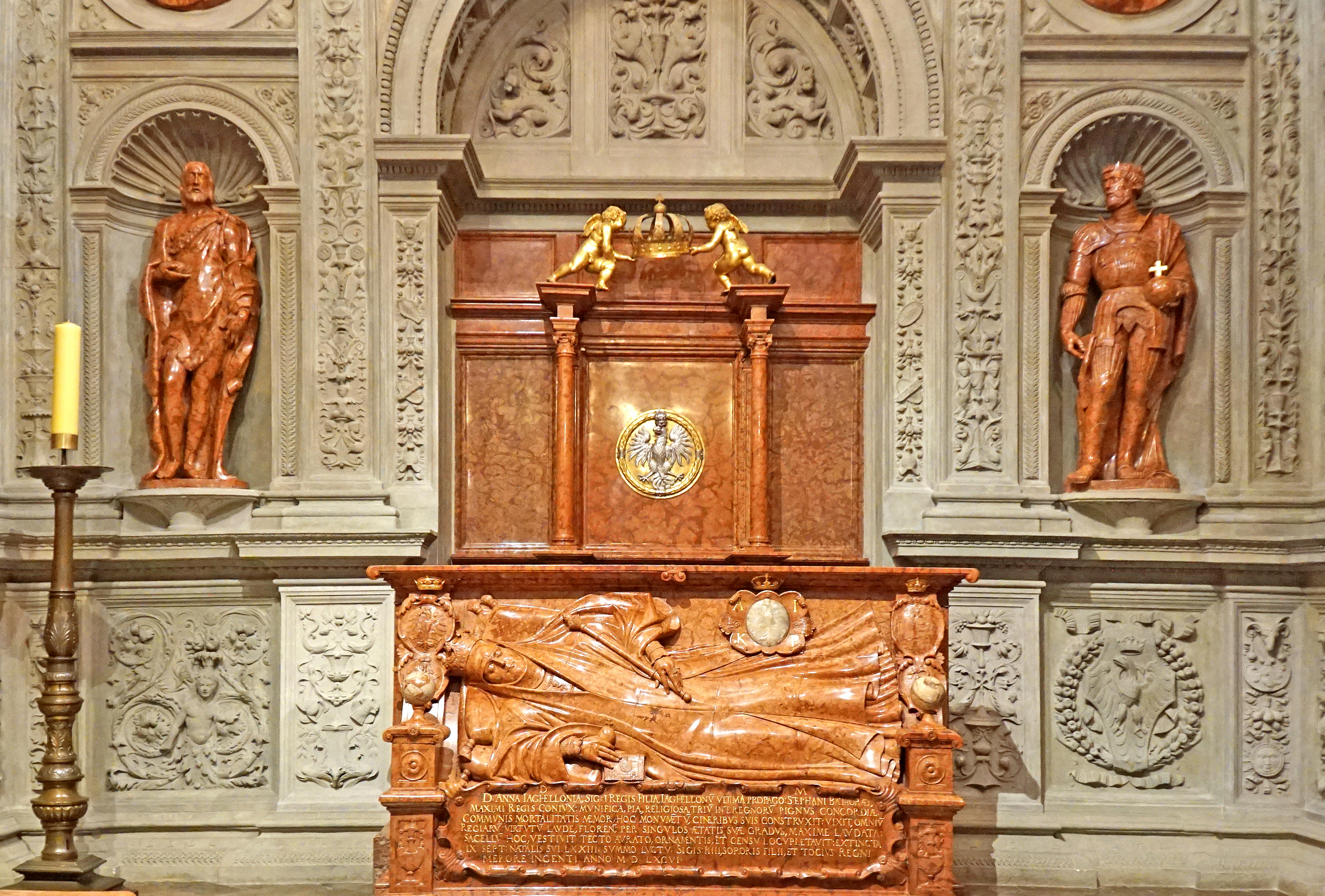
An elaborate and gilded tombstone of Queen Anna Jagiellon

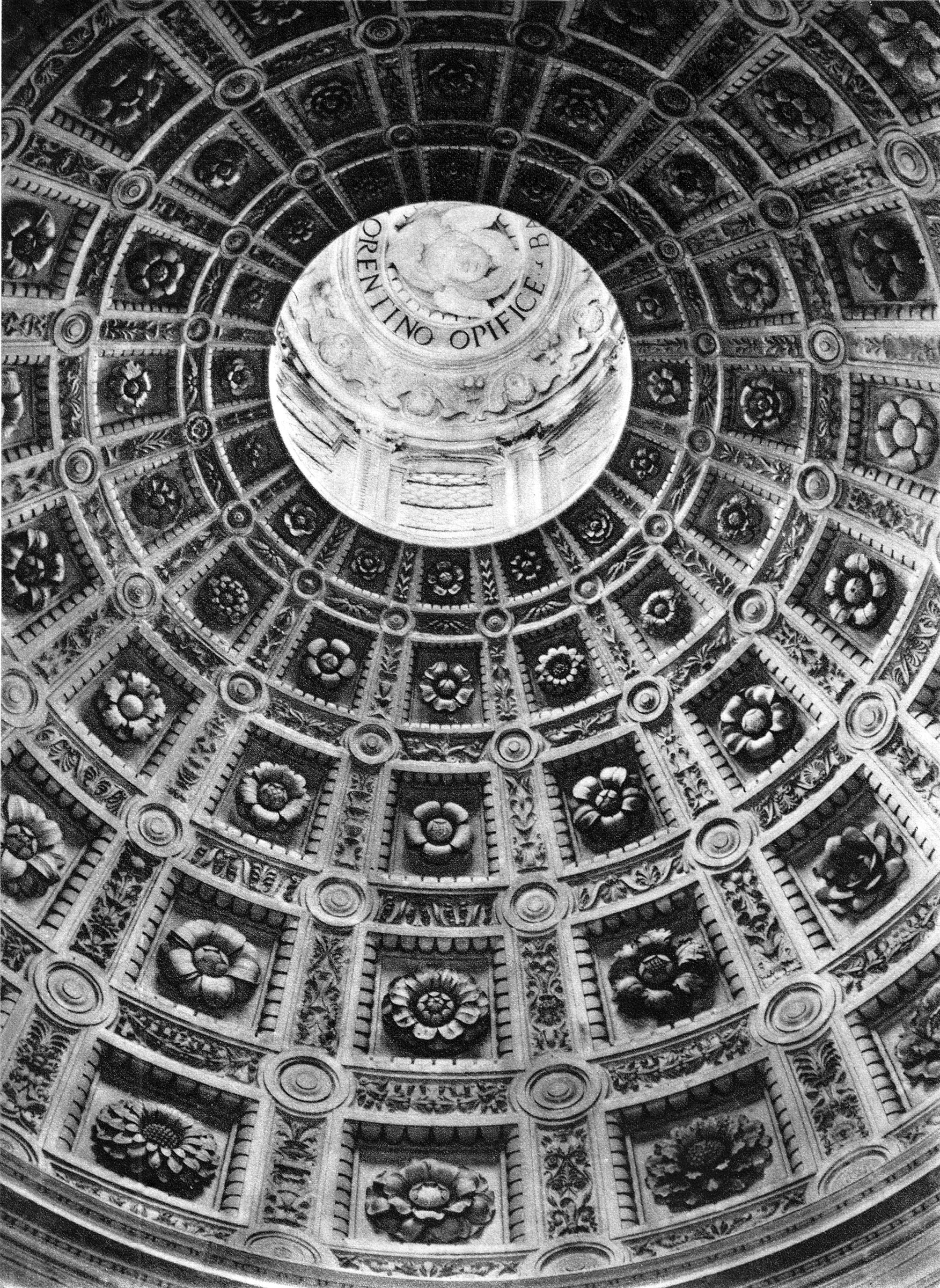
Coffered dome of the chapel photographed in 1951

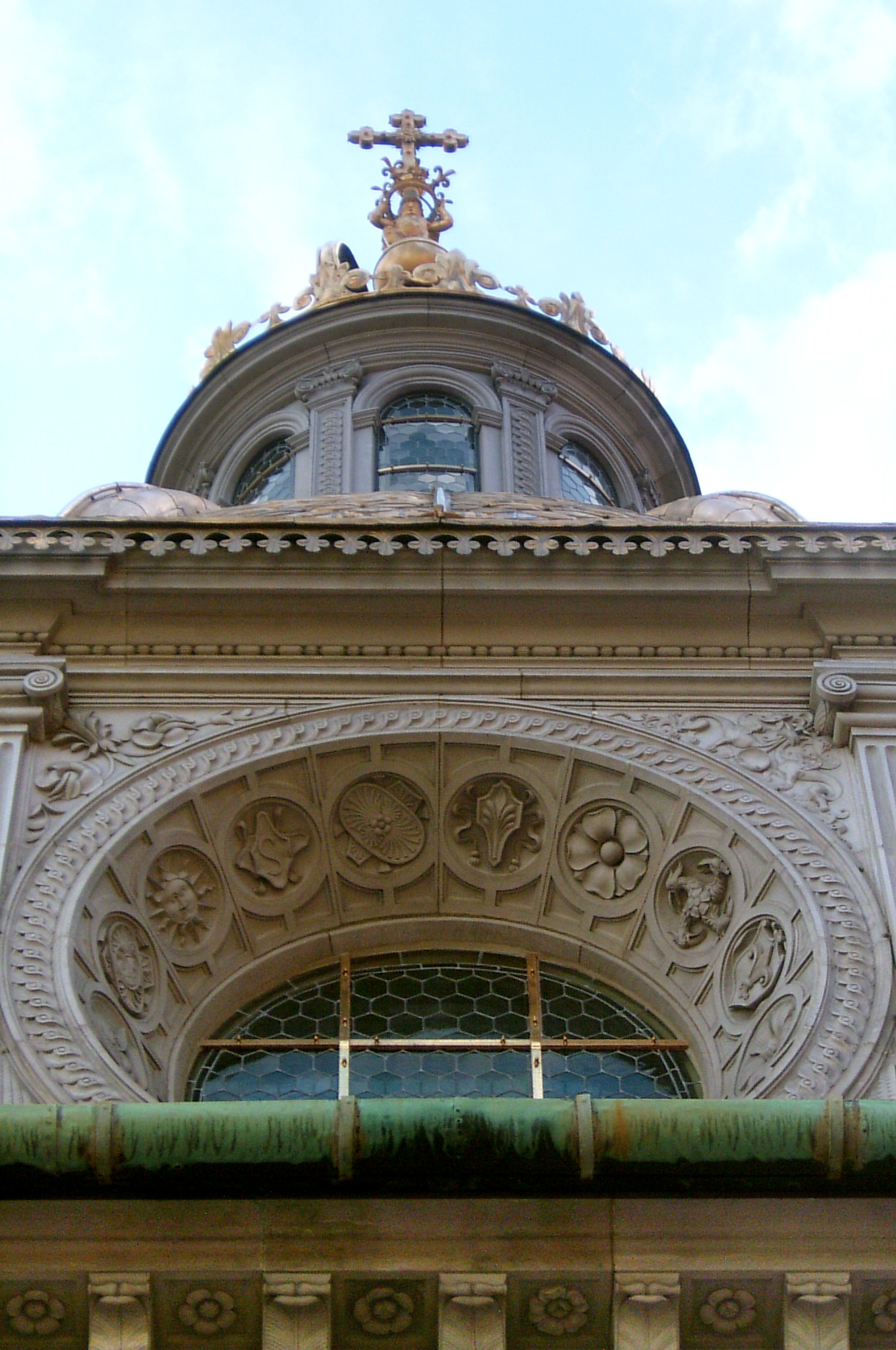
Window decoration and a spire sit atop the dome

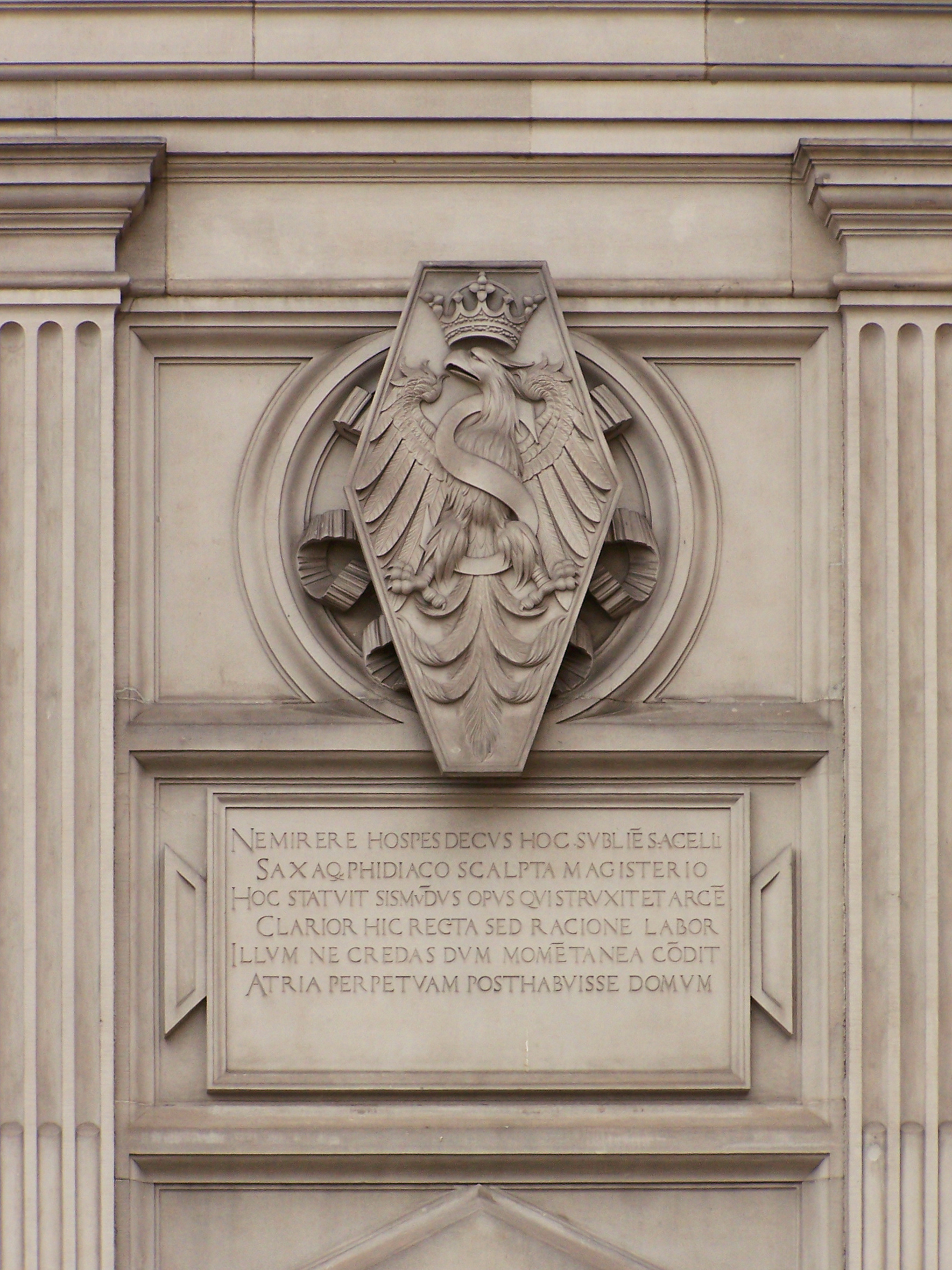
Polish white eagle with Sigismund I the Old's monogram "S"

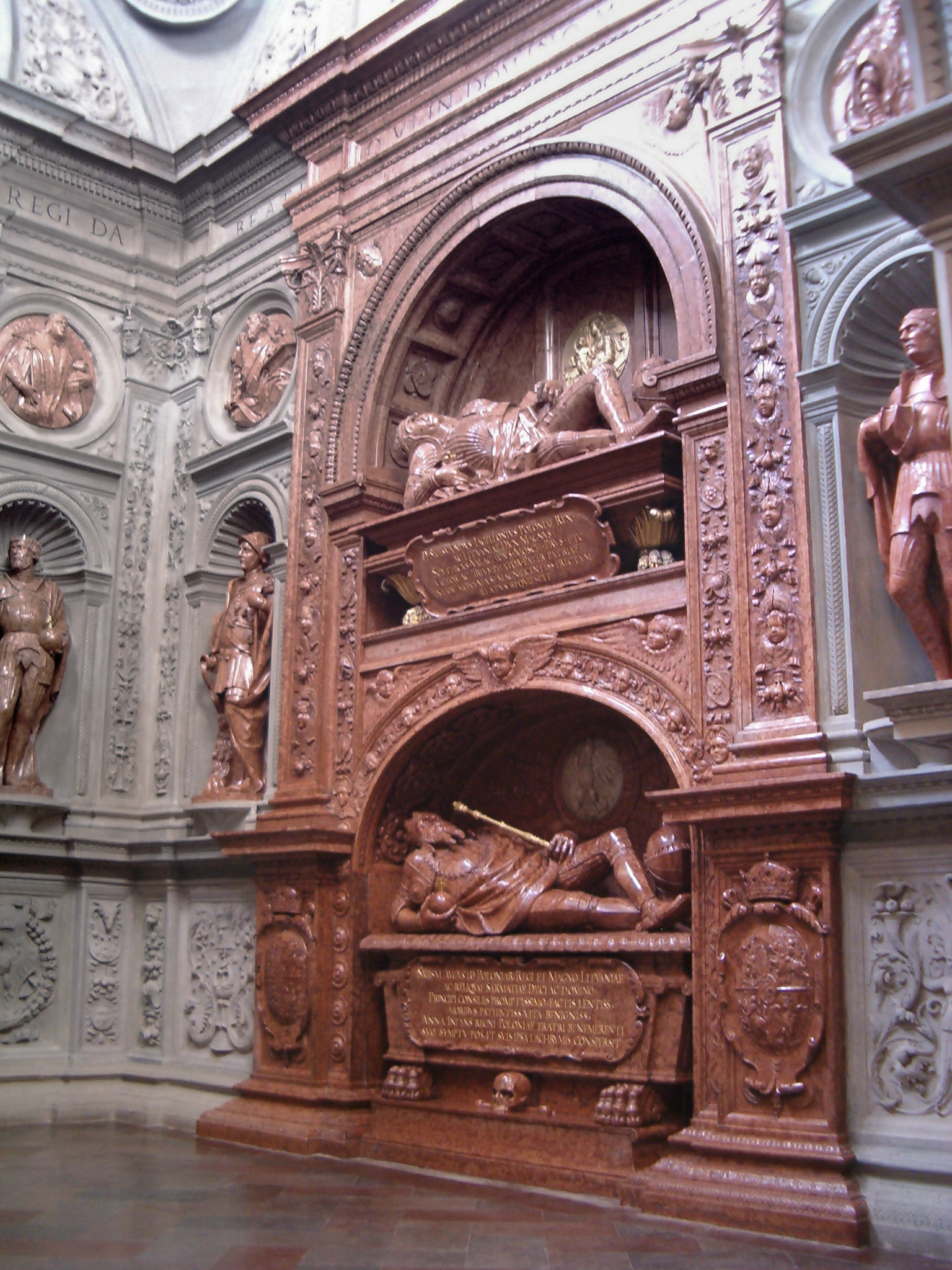
Tomb monument of Sigismund I the Old and Sigismund II Augustus in the Chapel

== See also ==
- Renaissance architecture
- Renaissance in Poland
- Jagiellon dynasty
- 16th-century Western domes
