= Sigismund I the Old =

King of Poland and Grand Duke of Lithuania from 1506 to 1548

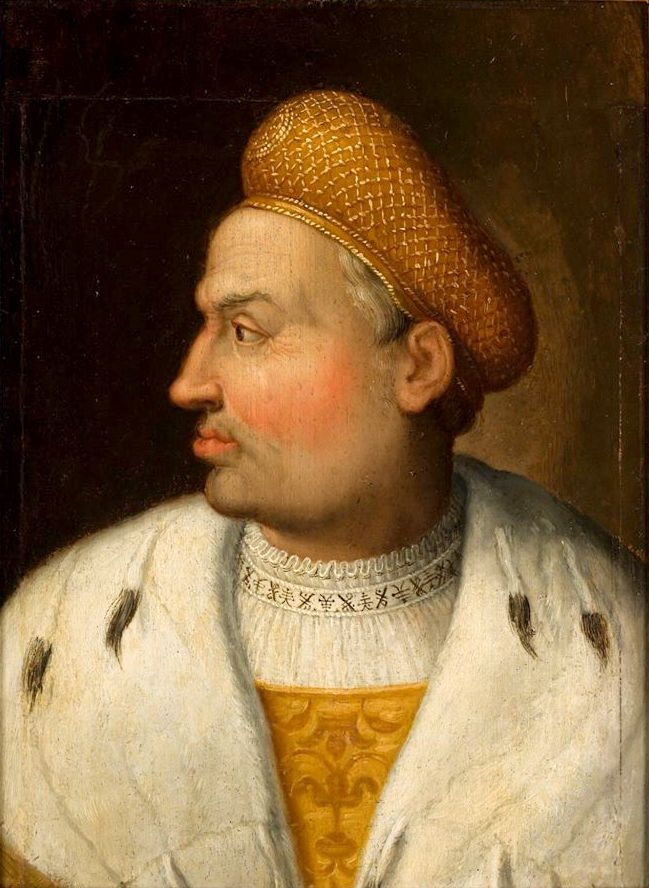
- Portrait by Kulmbach, c. 1511–1518

King of Poland Grand Duke of Lithuania
- Reign: 20 October/8 December 1506 (Note: Proclaimed Grand Duke in October, proclaimed King in December) – 1 April 1548
- Coronation: 24 January 1507 in Wawel Cathedral, Kraków
- Predecessor: Alexander
- Successor: Sigismund II Augustus
- Co-ruler: Sigismund II Augustus (1529 – 1548)
- Born: 1 January 1467; Kozienice, Poland
- Died: 1 April 1548 (aged 81); Kraków, Poland
- Burial: 7 July 1548; Wawel Cathedral, Kraków
- Spouse: Barbara Zápolya (m. 1512; died 1515) Bona Sforza (m. 1517)
- Issue more...: John, Bishop of Poznań; Hedwig, Electress of Bradenburg; Isabella, Queen of Hungary; Sigismund II Augustus, King of Poland; Sophia, Duchess of Brunswick-Lüneburg; Anna, Queen of Poland; Catherine, Queen of Sweden
- Dynasty: Jagiellon
- Father: Casimir IV Jagiellon
- Mother: Elizabeth of Austria
- Religion: Catholic Church
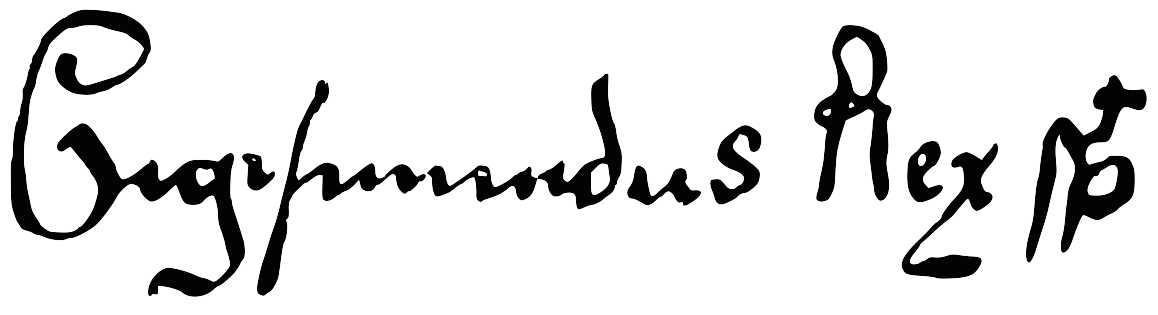
- Signature

Sigismund I the Old (Polish: Zygmunt I Stary, Lithuanian: Žygimantas I Senasis; 1 January 1467 – 1 April 1548) was King of Poland and Grand Duke of Lithuania from 1506 until his death in 1548. He was a member of the Jagiellonian dynasty, the son of Casimir IV and younger brother of Kings John I Albert and Alexander Jagiellon. He was nicknamed "the Old" in later historiography to distinguish him from his son and successor, Sigismund II Augustus. Before ascending to the Polish and Lithuanian thrones, he was Duke of Głogów from 1499, Duke of Opava from 1501, and governor of Silesia from 1504 on behalf of his brother, King Vladislaus II of Bohemia and Hungary.

Sigismund was born in the town of Kozienice in 1467 as the fifth son of Casimir IV and Elizabeth of Austria. He was one of thirteen children and was not expected to assume the throne after his father. Sigismund's eldest brother and rightful heir Vladislaus II instead became the King of Bohemia, Hungary and Croatia as the successor to George of Poděbrady in Bohemia and then to Matthias Corvinus in Hungary, thus temporarily uniting these kingdoms. When Casimir died IV, the Polish-Lithuanian realm was divided between the remaining two older sons, with John Albert being crowned King of Poland, and Alexander as Grand Duke of Lithuania. Alexander inherited Poland following John I Albert's sudden death in 1501. Hence, Sigismund's reign only began when he succeeded Alexander to both titles in 1506 at the age of 39.

A capable monarch and a patron of the arts, Sigismund established Polish rule over Ducal Prussia and annexed the Duchy of Mazovia with Warsaw, while retaining the nation's wealth and prominence in the region. He made sure that his nephew Albert, Duke of Prussia, and Albert's Protestant successors would pay feudal homage or tribute to Polish monarchs as a sign of political and diplomatic dependence. This was observed until the Treaty of Bromberg in 1657, when Brandenburg gained sovereignty over Ducal Prussia. Sigismund and his commander Jan Amor Tarnowski also defeated Moldavia at Obertyn in 1531, and Muscovy in 1535, thereby strengthening the country's eastern borders. His 42 years reign was further marked by decisive contributions to Polish architecture, cuisine, language, and customs, especially at the behest of his second wife, the Italian-born Bona Sforza. Italian styles and fashions dominated at the height of the Polish Renaissance and Polish Golden Age, which developed the Catholic identity of Poland. He was commemorated on a contemporary 200 złoty banknote.

Sigismund was married twice, first to a noblewoman Barbara Zápolya from Hungary and then to Bona Sforza, the daughter of Gian Galeazzo Sforza, Duke of Milan. He had only one surviving legitimate son, Sigismund Augustus, who was made his co-king vivente rege in 1529 and formally assumed the throne when Sigismund I the Old died in 1548.

== Early life and coronation ==
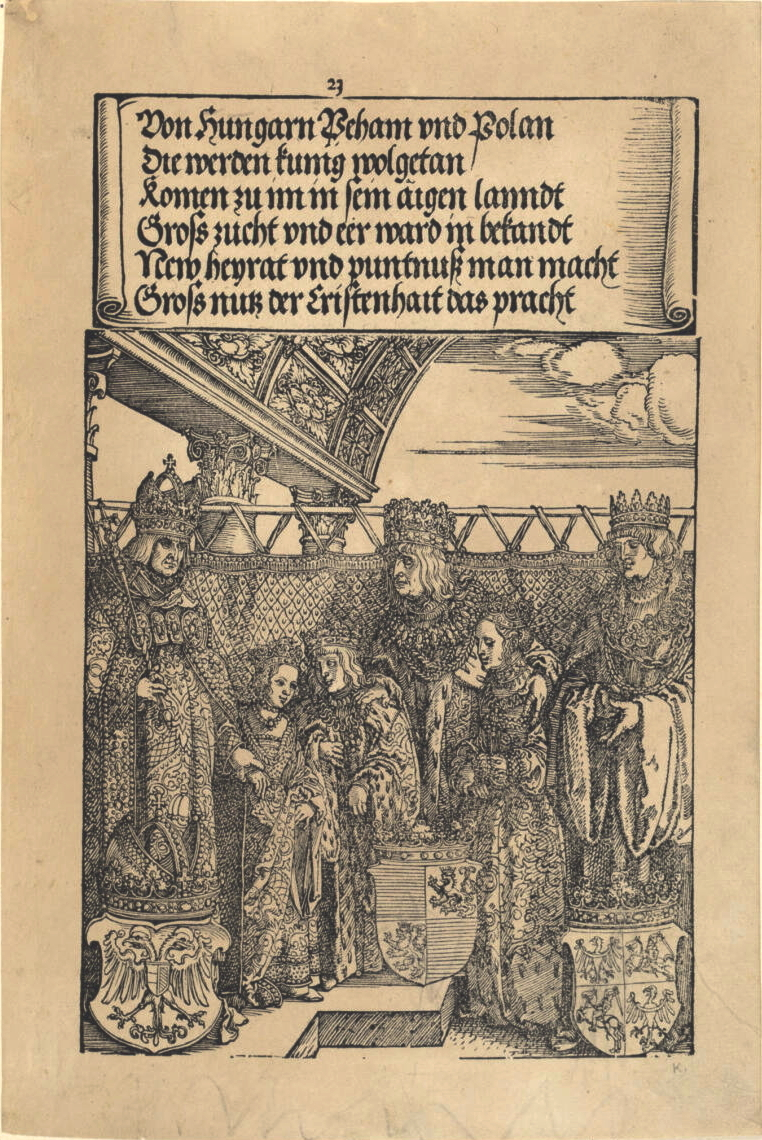
Sigismund (far right) with Emperor Maximilian I and brother Vladislaus II in Vienna, 1515, woodcut by Albrecht Dürer

Sigismund was the son of King Casimir IV Jagiellon and Elizabeth of Austria. He followed his brothers John Albert and Alexander to the Polish throne. Their eldest brother Vladislaus became king of Bohemia, Hungary, and Croatia. Sigismund was christened as the namesake of his maternal great-grandfather, Holy Roman Emperor Sigismund.

When Casimir IV died in 1492, Sigismund was his only son without any titles or land. From 1495 to 1496, he petitioned his brother Alexander to provide him with land, and Elizabeth of Austria attempted to install him on the Austrian throne. Both efforts failed. In 1497, King John I Albert, his older brother, led an invasion of Moldavia that was intended to place Sigismund on its throne. This, too, was a disastrous failure. Finally, his eldest brother Vladislaus II, King of Bohemia and Hungary, granted him the duchies of Głogów (1499) and Opava (1501), and in 1504 Sigismund became governor of Silesia and Lower Lusatia.

John I Albert died suddenly in 1501, and was succeeded by Alexander I, who died in 1506. After his death, Sigismund arrived in Vilnius, where he was elected by the Lithuanian Ducal Council on 20 September 1506 as Grand Duke of Lithuania, contrary to the Union of Mielnik (1501), which proposed a joint Polish-Lithuanian election of a monarch. On 8 December 1506, during the session of the Polish Senate in Piotrków, Sigismund was elected King of Poland. He arrived in Kraków on 20 January 1507 and was crowned four days later in Wawel Cathedral by Primate Andrzej Boryszewski.

== Internal politics ==
=== Crown of the Kingdom of Poland ===
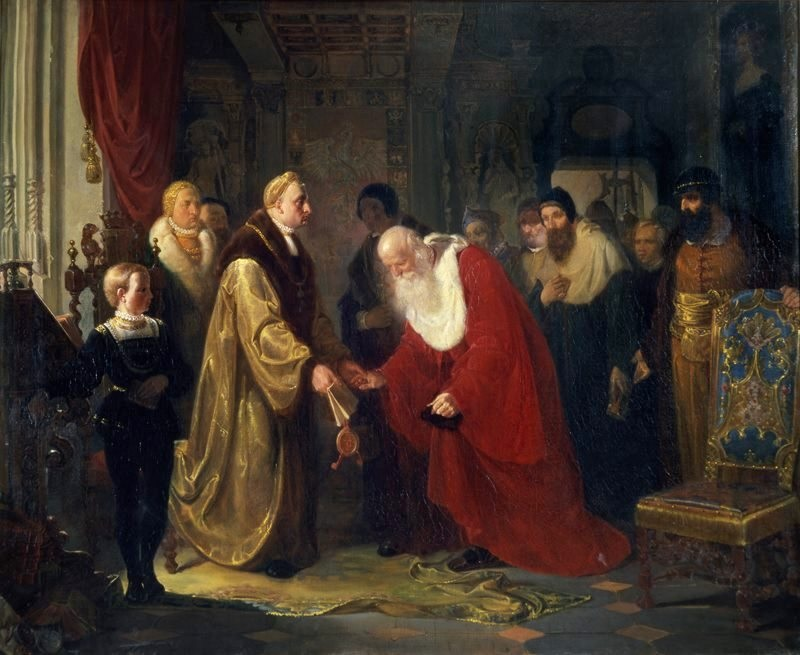
Sigismund grants a noble status to the professors of the Jagiellonian University, 1535, painting by Jan Matejko

The internal situation in Poland was characterised by broad authorisation of the Chamber of Deputies, confirmed and extended in the constitution of Nihil novi. During Alexander's reign, the law of Nihil novi had been instituted, which forbade kings of Poland from enacting laws without the consent of the Sejm. Sigismund had little control over the act, unlike the senators, whom he personally appointed. Eventually, during his reign, Sigismund benefited from the advice of the local nobility, competent ministers in charge of the royal judiciary system, and the wealthy, influential treasurers of Kraków. Although he was reluctant to the parliamentary system and political independence of the nobility, he recognised the authority of legal norms, supported legalism and summoned annual sessions of the Sejm, usually obtaining funds for state defence. However, he was unsuccessful in attempting to create a permanent fund for defence from the annual income tax. Despite this, in 1527, he established a conscript army and the bureaucracy needed to finance it. He set up the legal codes that formalised serfdom in Poland, placing the peasants into the private estates of nobles.

Likely related to tax matters was an unsuccessful attempt on the life of the king, made on 5 May 1523. The identity of the would-be assassin - who shot the ruler while he was strolling in the evening around the cloisters of the Wawel Castle - and his potential supporters was never established. Unclear motives remained after the assassination attempt. Three weeks before the event, Sigismund I introduced a new edict that was very unfavourable and somewhat hostile to the high-ranking nobles and their interests.

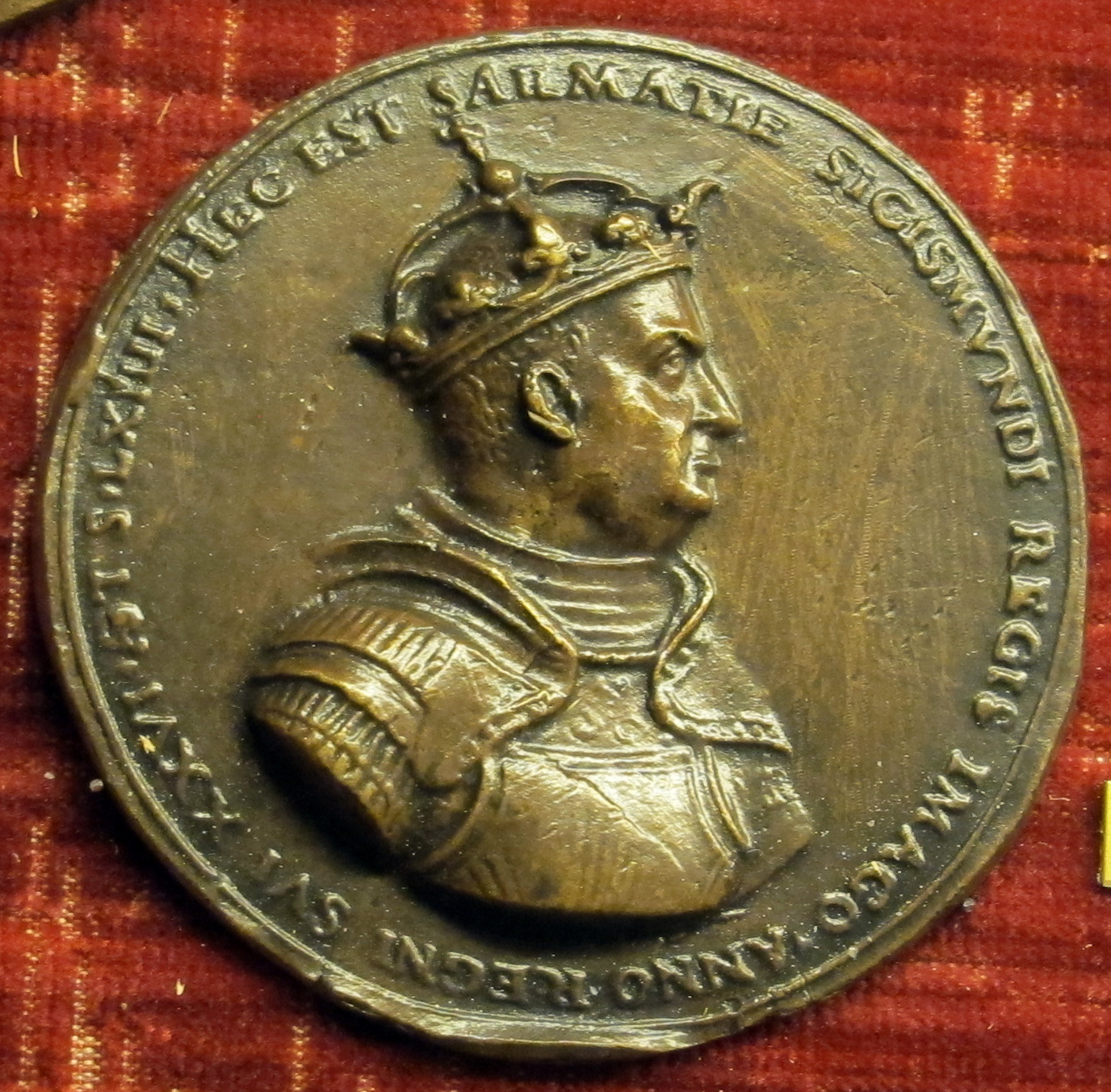
Medal featuring the profile of Sigismund I, by Giovanni Maria Mosca

Sigismund I achieved several economic successes, including partial debt reduction, the separation of accounts of public taxation from the royal treasury, the strengthening of the activities of the mint operating in Kraków, and the attempt to organise the processing of income from operating salt mines. Furthermore, he issued a statute for the Armenians (1519) and strongly intended to harmonise the judicial system across the country.

Between 1530 and 1538, the king issued two statutes defining the rules for the selection of the monarch, which permanently established the election viritim. The laws held that all social groups, regardless of their wealth, could watch the election process (unusquisque qui vellet), and the election was to be free (electio Regis libera).

Sigismund successfully organised the agricultural economy, looked after the development of the royal cities and recovered numerous goods of the treasury belonging to the crown that were under lien. During the financial activities, the King received full support of his wife, Queen Bona, who aimed to expand the royal estates by purchasing and improving economic efficiency. In 1514, he set up the Council of Four Lands and put Abraham of Bohemia in charge of it.

Sigismund I vested various localities with town rights, including Choroszcz, Chorzele, Czemierniki, Dobre, Karczew, Kołbiel, Kowal, Kowel, Leszno, Ostrów Lubelski, Rejowiec, Włoszczowa, Andrzejewo, Boćki, Bychawa, Kleszczele, Narew, Waniewo, Brzeżany, Nowogródek, Słonim and Torczyn.

=== Chicken War Rebellion ===
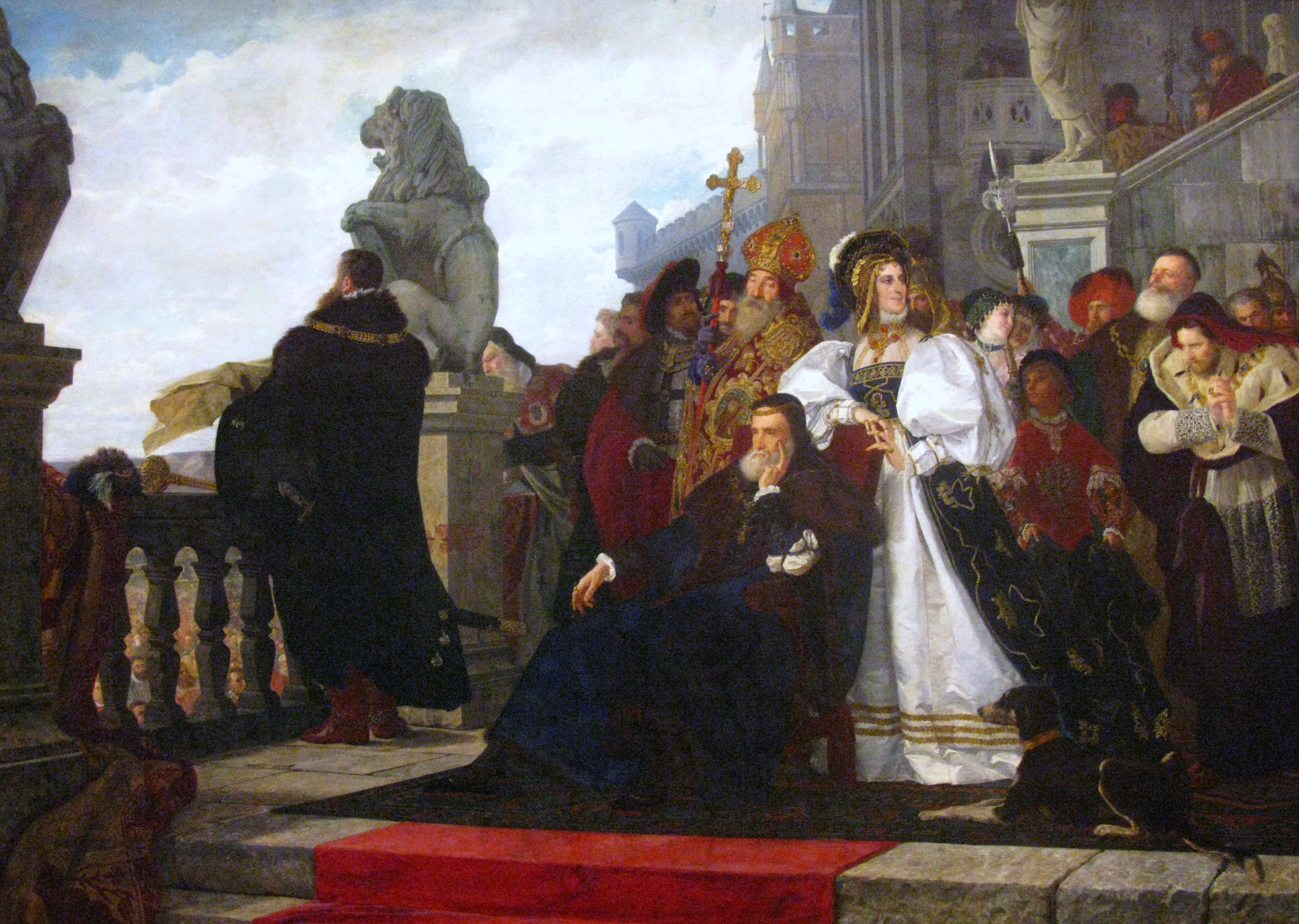
Chicken War in 1537 by Henryk Rodakowski. Seated Sigismund is accompanied by his wife Bona Sforza and royal court whilst being surrounded by an angry mob at Lwów High Castle

At the start of his reign, King Sigismund I the Old inherited a Kingdom of Poland with a century-long tradition of liberties of the nobility, confirmed in numerous privileges. A rebellion in Lwów widely known as the Chicken War (Polish: Wojna kokosza) was an anti-royalist and anti-absolutist rokosz (revolt) by the Polish nobility that occurred in 1537. The derisive name was coined by the magnates, who for the most part supported the King and claimed that the "war's" only effect was the near-extinction of the local chickens, eaten by the nobles gathered for the rebellion at Lwów in eastern part of Lesser Poland.

To strengthen his power, Sigismund initiated a set of reforms, establishing a permanent conscription army in 1527 and extending the bureaucratic apparatus necessary to govern the state and finance the army. Supported by his Italian consort Bona Sforza, he began buying up land and issue agriculture reformas to enlarge the royal treasury. He initiated a process of restitution of royal properties, previously pawned or rented to the nobles.

The nobility gathered near the city to meet in a levée en masse and called for a military campaign against Moldavia. However, the lesser and middle strata of the nobility organised a revolt to force the King to abandon his risky reforms. The nobles presented him with 36 demands, most notably a cessation of further land acquisitions by Queen Bona, exemption of the nobility from the tithe, confirmation and extension of privileges for nobles and adoption of a law concerning Incompatibilitas — an individual wouldn't be able to hold two or more official administrative positions in the country. The role of the Incompatibilitas was to prevent wealthy magnates from usurping too much power at the expense of lesser nobles.

However, the revolt soon transpired that the nobility's leaders were divided and that achieving a settlement was almost impossible. Too weak to start a civil war against the King, the protesters finally agreed to what was thought to be a compromise. Sigismund rejected most of their demands, while accepting the principle of Incompatibilitas the following year and agreeing not to force the election of the future king in vivente rege. Thereupon, the nobility returned to their homes, having achieved little.

== Foreign politics ==
=== War with Moscow ===
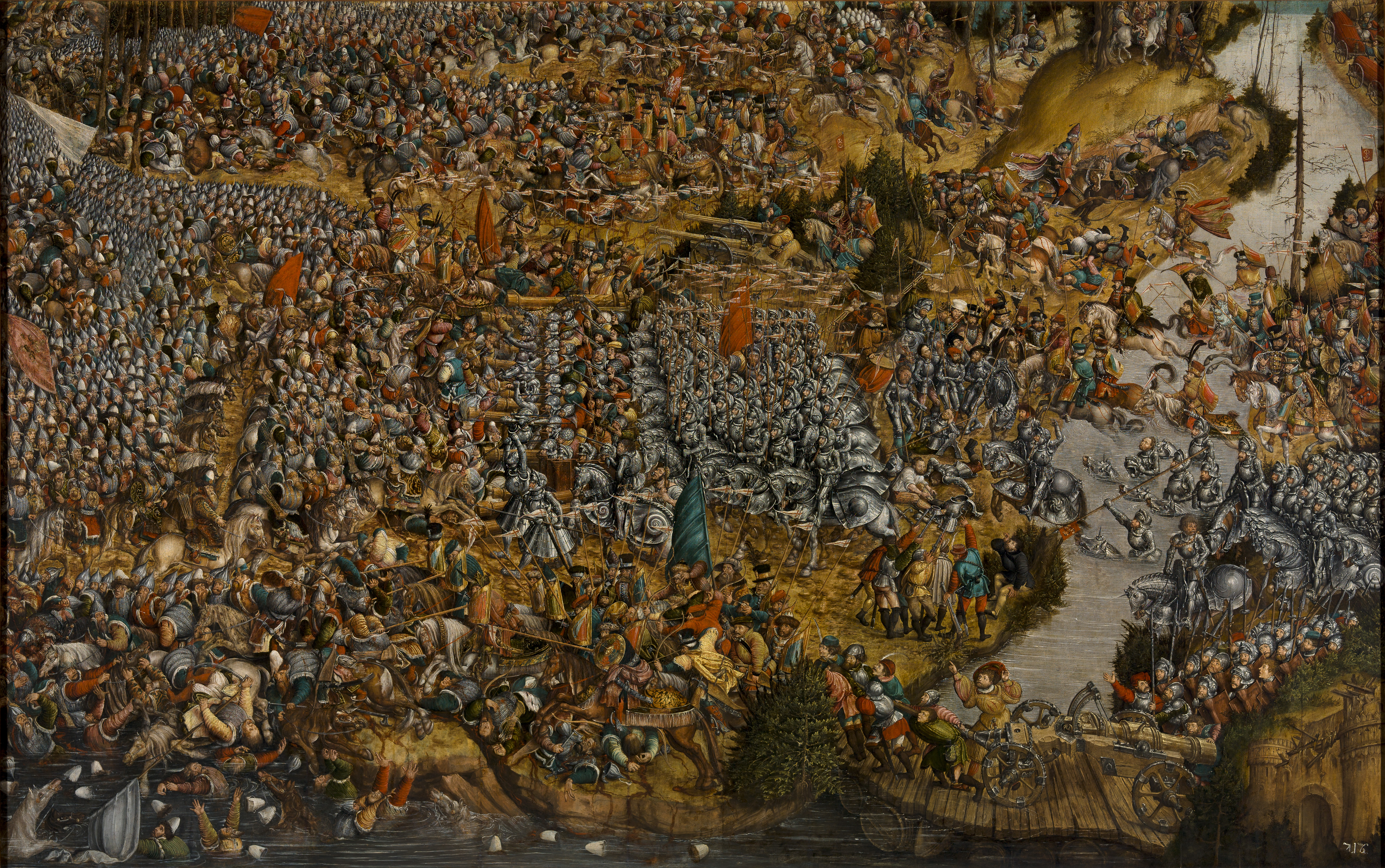
Polish-Lithuanian army during the Battle of Orsha in 1514, by Hans Krell

Sigismund was intermittently at war with Vasili III of Muscovy beginning in 1507, before the Polish army was fully under his command. Further tensions escalated when Vasili also discovered that Sigismund was bribing Khan Meñli I Giray to attack the Grand Duchy of Moscow. In December 1512, Muscovite forces marched into the Grand Duchy of Lithuania seeking to capture Smolensk, a major trading center between Russia and Europe. The initial six- and four-week sieges in 1513 were a failure, but the city fell to the Muscovites in July 1514.

Russia subsequently suffered a series of disastrous defeats in the field. In 1512, Grand Hetman of Lithuania, Konstanty Ostrogski, ransacked the region of Severia and vanquished a Russian force of approximately 6,000 men. On 8 September 1514, Muscovy suffered a major defeat at the Battle of Orsha, which prevented the Russians from placing all the former Kievan Rus' lands under their lordship. Poland exploited the battle for propaganda purposes with strong anti-Russian sentiment. A letter sent to Rome stated that "Muscovites are not Christians; they are cruel and barbaric; they are Asians and not Europeans; they are in league with Turks and the Tatars to destroy Christendom".

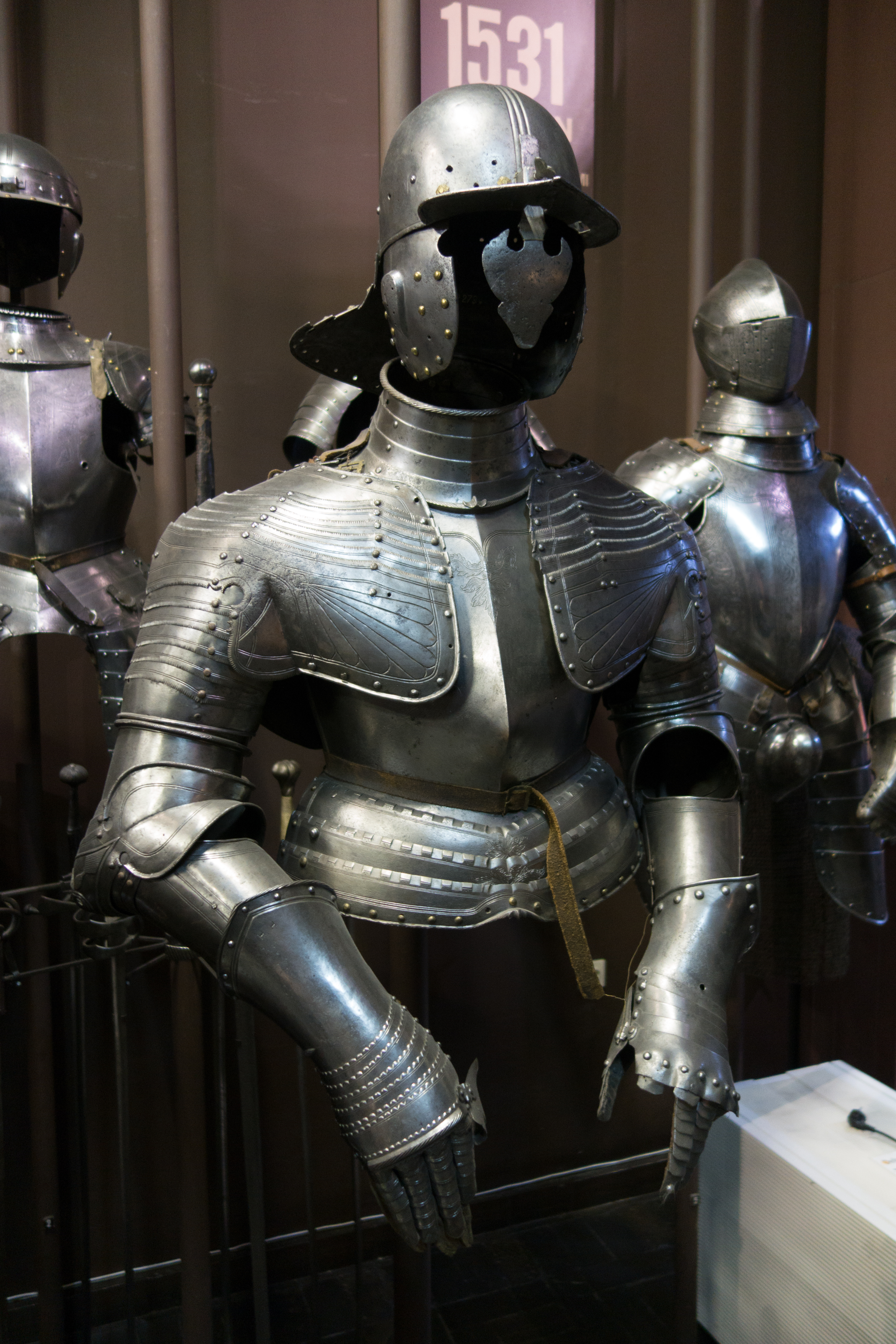
Sigismund's halfarmour, Polish Army Museum

Regardless of victory, the Polish–Lithuanian troops were incapable of moving quickly enough to retake Smolensk. In 1518, Russian forces were again beaten during the siege of Polotsk, when according to legend the Lithuanian forces were inspired by the sight of their patron saint, Saint Casimir, the older brother of Sigismund. However, this was dubbed by historians as a folk tale. In 1522, a truce was signed between Lithuania and Muscovy, which extended until 1534.

In 1534, when Grand Hetman Jerzy Radziwiłł and the Tatars pillaged western Russia, the Muscovites, in retaliation, invaded Lithuania once more. They were eventually stopped by Polish commander Jan Amor Tarnowski and allies at Starodub in 1535. Their defeat strengthened the Polish-Lithuanian union's eastern flank until the beginning of the Livonian War in 1558.

=== Europe ===
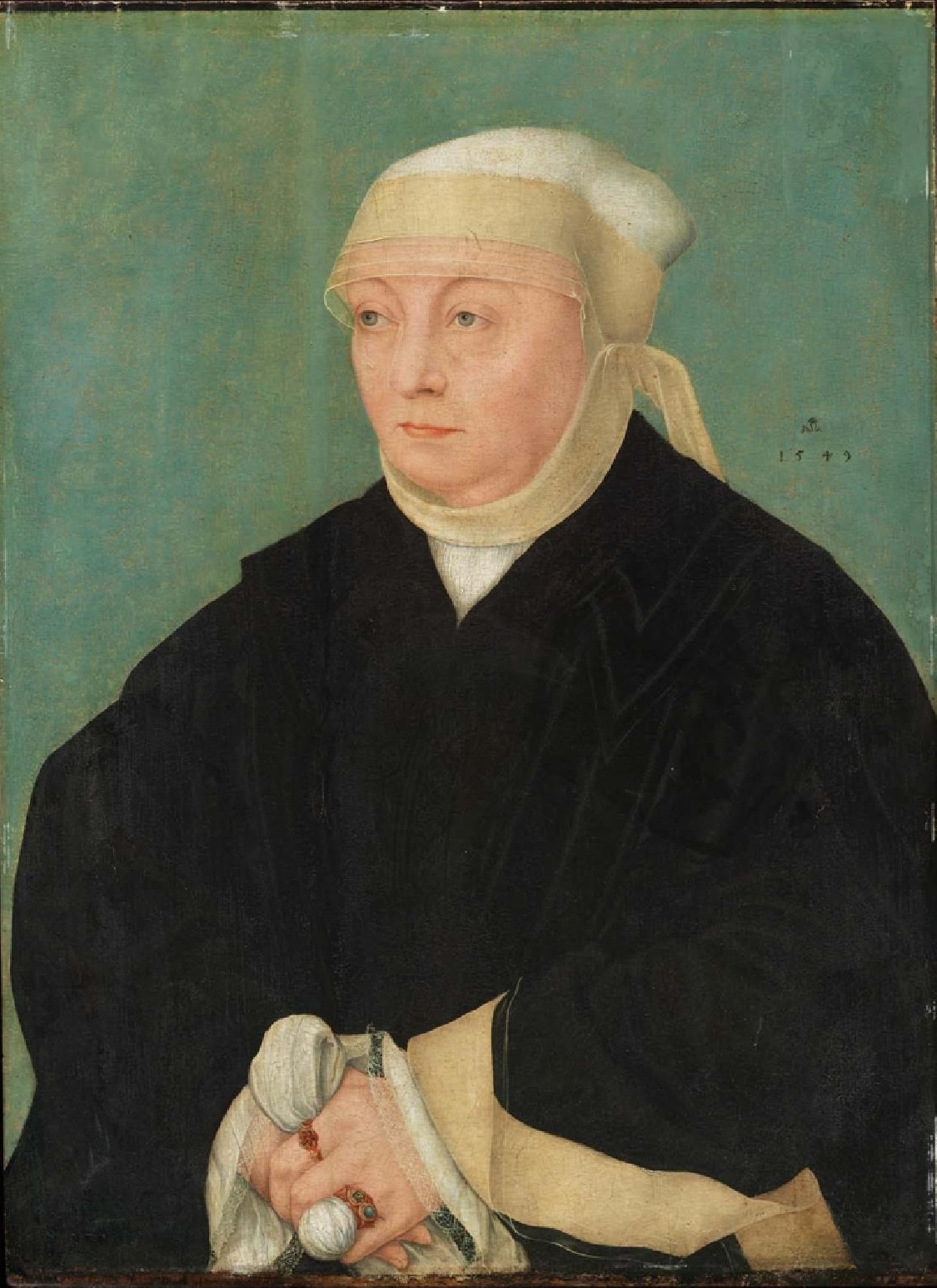
Queen Bona Sforza was instrumental in establishing alliances for Poland and Lithuania. She was known for being a notorious conspirator.

In 1515, Sigismund entered into an alliance with the Holy Roman Emperor Maximilian I. In return for Maximilian lending weight to the provisions of the Second Peace of Thorn (1466), Sigismund consented to the marriage of the children of Vladislaus II of Hungary, his brother, to the grandchildren of Maximilian. Through this double marriage contract, Bohemia and Hungary passed to the House of Habsburg in 1526, on the death of Sigismund's nephew, Louis II of Hungary, who led his forces against Suleiman the Magnificent of the Ottoman Empire in the disastrous Battle of Mohács.

Worried about the growing ties between the Habsburgs and Russia, in 1524 Sigismund I signed a Franco-Polish alliance with King Francis I of France to avoid a possible war on two fronts. Francis I himself was looking for allies in Central Europe to curtail the increasing power of Habsburg Emperor Charles V, whose realms were labelled "the empire on which the sun never sets". Furthermore, Queen Bona was instrumental in establishing an alliance between Poland and France, with the objective of recovering Milan. The official negotiations were conducted by Antonio Rincon in 1524, who was then followed by Jerome Laski. Through the agreement, the son of Francis, Henry, Duke of Orléans, was to marry one of Sigismund's daughters, and Sigismund's eldest son was to marry a daughter of Francis I.

The negotiations came to an end and the alliance was disbanded when Francis' troops were defeated by Charles V at the Battle of Pavia in 1525. Disturbed by the failure of his campaign, Francis turned to Hungary instead and formed a Franco-Hungarian alliance with King John Zápolya in 1528.

After the death of Janusz III of Masovia in 1526, Sigismund succeeded in uniting the Duchy of Masovia and Warsaw with the Kingdom of Poland. There was speculation whether Janusz and his younger brother Stanisław were poisoned by a subject of Queen Bona. The accusations were so pervasive and rampant that Sigismund ordered an investigation, as a result of which a special edict was declared on 9 February 1528 confirming that the Masovian princes died naturally or due to related illness. According to chronicler Jan Długosz, the real cause of the death of both princes could have been inherited tuberculosis.

In other matters of policy, Sigismund sought peaceful coexistence with the Khanate of Crimea, but was unable to completely end border skirmishes.

=== Teutonic Knights ===
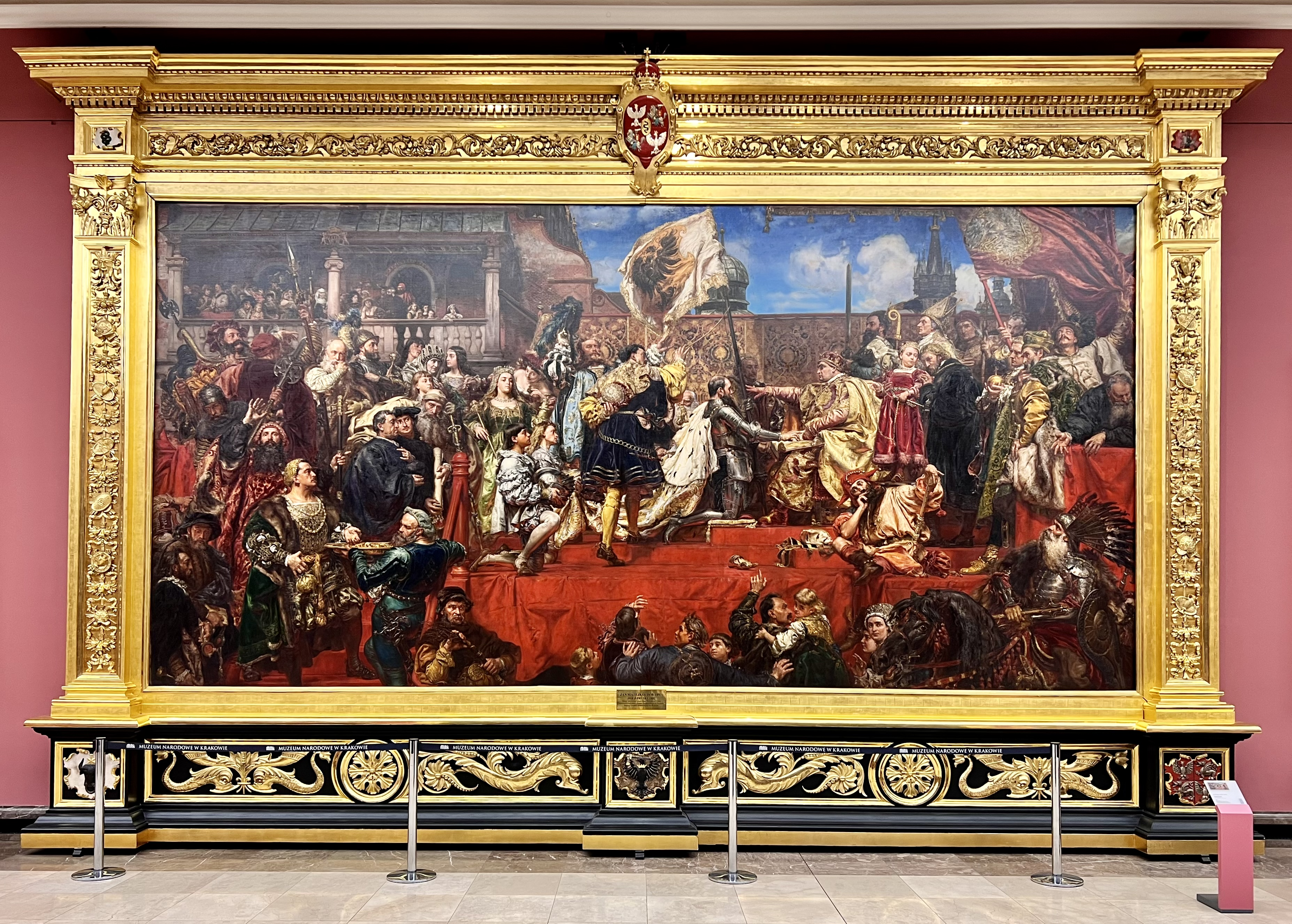
Prussian Homage, by Jan Matejko, 1882, Albrecht Hohenzollern receives the Duchy of Prussia in fief from Poland's King Sigismund I the Old, 1525

Over two centuries of wars against the Teutonic Knights ended in 1525 with the Treaty of Kraków after the final Polish–Teutonic War (1519–1521). Previously, the Second Peace of Thorn (1466) placed the Teutonic Order under Polish suzerainty and interfered with German interests in Livonia, Pomerania, Warmia and Masuria. The Order attempted to avoid paying tribute to Polish monarchs, which was a demonstration of weakness and dependence.

In accordance with the new Treaty of Kraków, the Order was abruptly secularised and turned de facto into a puppet state of Poland, which lasted until the Treaty of Bromberg in 1655. Sigismund's nephew Albert, Duke of Prussia, converted to Lutheranism under the persuasion of Martin Luther, and paid a feudal homage to Sigismund. In return he was granted the domains of the Order as the First Duke of Prussia. This became known in Polish and Lithuanian history as the "Prussian Homage", which was often featured in the arts. The Prussian Landtag and parliament assembled in Königsberg, where envoys embraced both the new Duke and the Protestant Reformation. Thereupon, the Teutonic Order lost its importance as a military order in Prussia and retreated to the Holy Roman Empire, where it became secluded.

== Renaissance and legacy ==
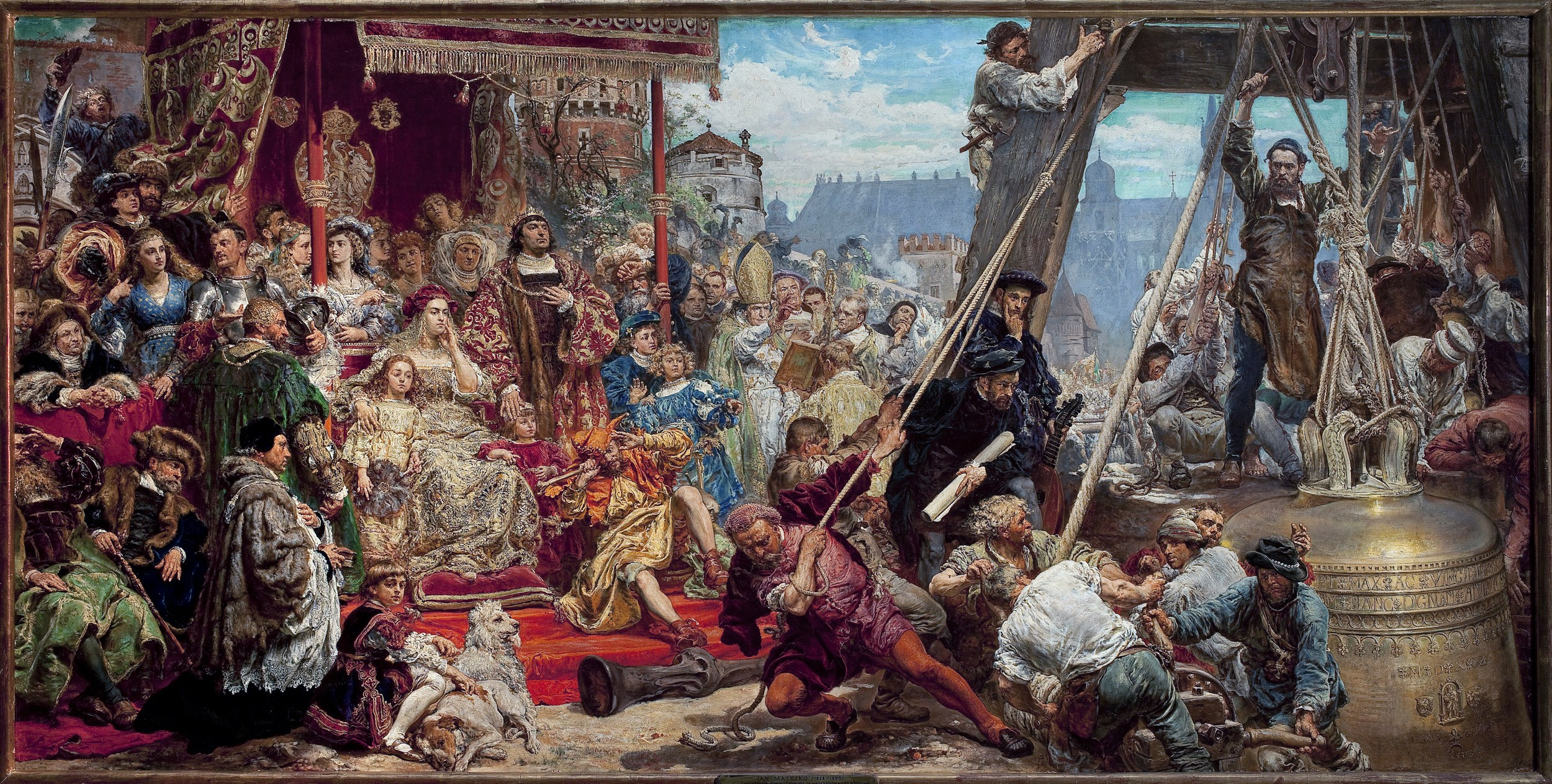
Hanging of the Sigismund Bell in 1521, by Jan Matejko

Sigismund had a profound interest in Renaissance humanism and the revival of classical antiquity. His second consort, Bona Sforza, daughter of Gian Galeazzo Sforza of Milan, was also instrumental in developing the Polish Renaissance and brought renowned Italian artists, architects and sculptors from her native country. It was under Sigismund's reign that the Renaissance began to flourish in Poland and in the Grand Duchy of Lithuania. Sigismund II Augustus later continued his father's legacy.

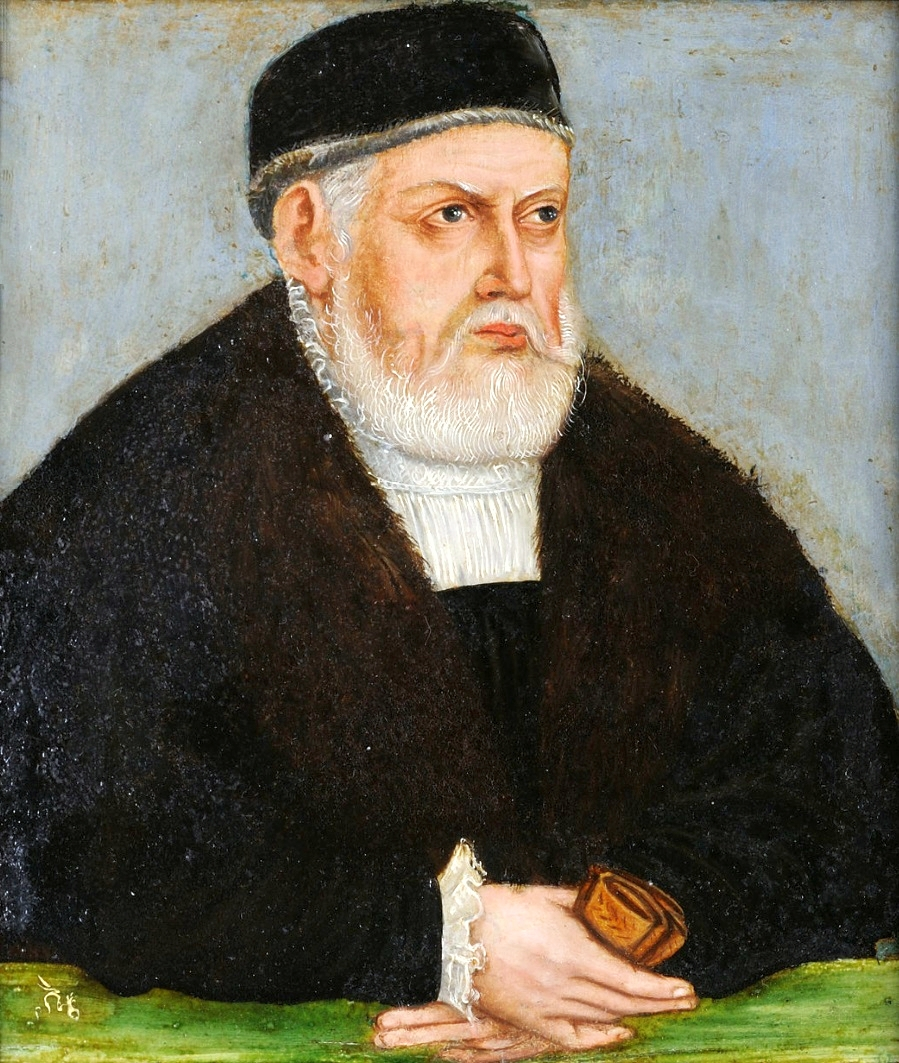
A posthumous portrait by Lucas Cranach the Younger made in around 1553

Among the illustrious figures that guested or lived in Poland at the time were Bartholommeo Berecci, Francesco Fiorentino, Santi and Mateo Gucci, Bernardo Morando, Giovanni Battista di Quadro and Hans Dürer. Most of the decorators working for the court were foreigners, especially Italians and Germans who had a profound impact on Poland's architecture as a whole. The centrepiece of their work is Wawel Castle in Kraków, the seat of Polish monarchs as well as one of the largest castles in Central Europe. Situated on a hill overlooking Old Town, the fortified residence was extensively reconstructed in the Renaissance style and to the personal needs of the royal family. The Italian cloistered courtyard in the shape of a quadrangle, corridors, archways and portals were designed by Fiorentino with the help of Benedykt from Sandomierz. A similar design was undertaken in Niepołomice Castle, the hunting retreat of the Jagiellons.

The most prominent example of Sigismund's architectural legacy is a funerary monument in the form of a chapel at Wawel Cathedral. It was constructed between 1519 and 1533 according to plans by Bartolomeo Berrecci of Florence, and serves as a mausoleum of the last Jagiellons. The exterior dome is gold-plated and interior tombs made of marble were designed by Santi Gucci. Historians, experts and architects unanimously voted the chapel as "the most beautiful example of the Tuscan Renaissance north of the Alps". The monarch also commissioned a 12.6-tonne bell which was named in his honour. The Royal Sigismund Bell was installed on 13 July 1521 on Wawel Cathedral's northernmost tower. Apart from religious and national holidays, the bell rang on some of the most significant moments in Polish history and is one of Poland's national symbols.

== Death and succession ==
Sigismund suffered from numerous illnesses and diseases, especially towards the end of his life. Most notably, he was tormented by constant fevers since youth as well as gout and acute rheumatism in the autumn of 1528. The condition, which severely affected his joints and right leg, was repetitive and continued in 1529 and 1534. It is likely that the reasons why Sigismund Augustus was made co-ruler vivente rege in 1529 were pervasive pains of his father and fear he would die unexpectedly. Furthermore, bad eating habits and a poor diet contributed to the king's ailing health, in particular large amounts of beer and mead. Eventually, the king's inability to walk forced him to be carried in a litter. However, despite his age, Sigismund was of sound mind throughout and remained active in politics until his death. In 1543, he recovered from an influenza which spread in Kraków and in 1545, he enjoyed a last hunting excursion to Niepołomice.

Sigismund died on 1 April 1548, Easter day at the age of 81 and was buried on 7 July at Wawel Cathedral in Kraków. He was interred together with his and Queen Bona's deceased younger son, Prince Albertus, who was placed in Sigismund's sarcophagus in the separate coffin. The King was succeeded by his only living legitimate son, Sigismund II Augustus, who became the last Jagiellon king of Poland and Grand Duke of Lithuania. In 1587 Sigismund the Old's grandson, Sigismund III from the House of Vasa, was elected King of Poland. He was the son of Catherine Jagiellon and her husband John III of Sweden. Hence, Sigismund III Vasa could not belong to the Jagiellonian dynasty through his mother, but the Jagiellon bloodline of Polish monarchs continued until the death of Sigismund III Vasa's second son John II Casimir Vasa.

== Portraits and art ==
Depictions of Sigismund I in art

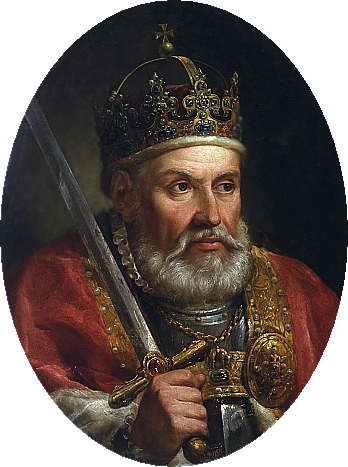
18th century depiction by Marcello Bacciarelli

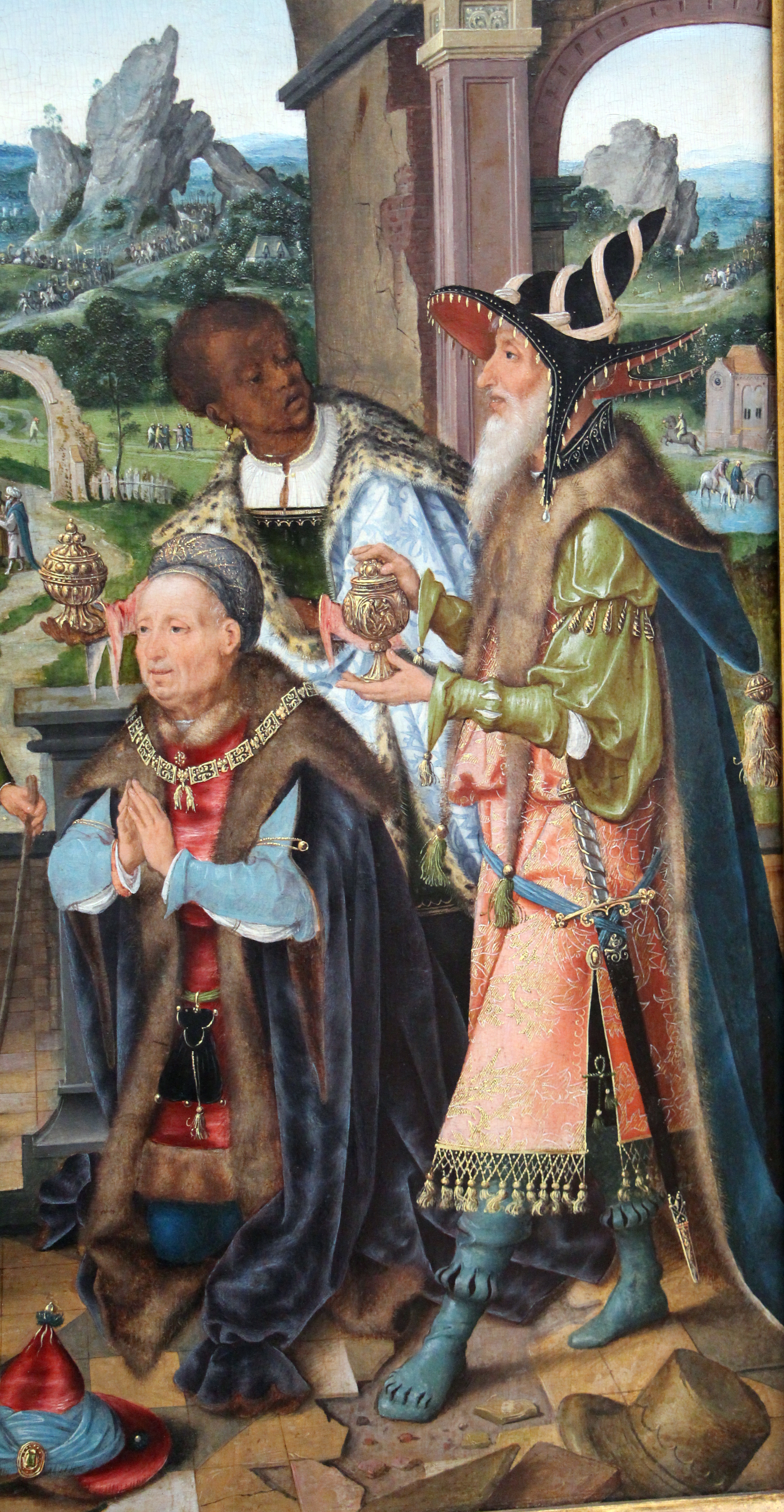
As one of the Magi by Joos van Cleve, c. 1520

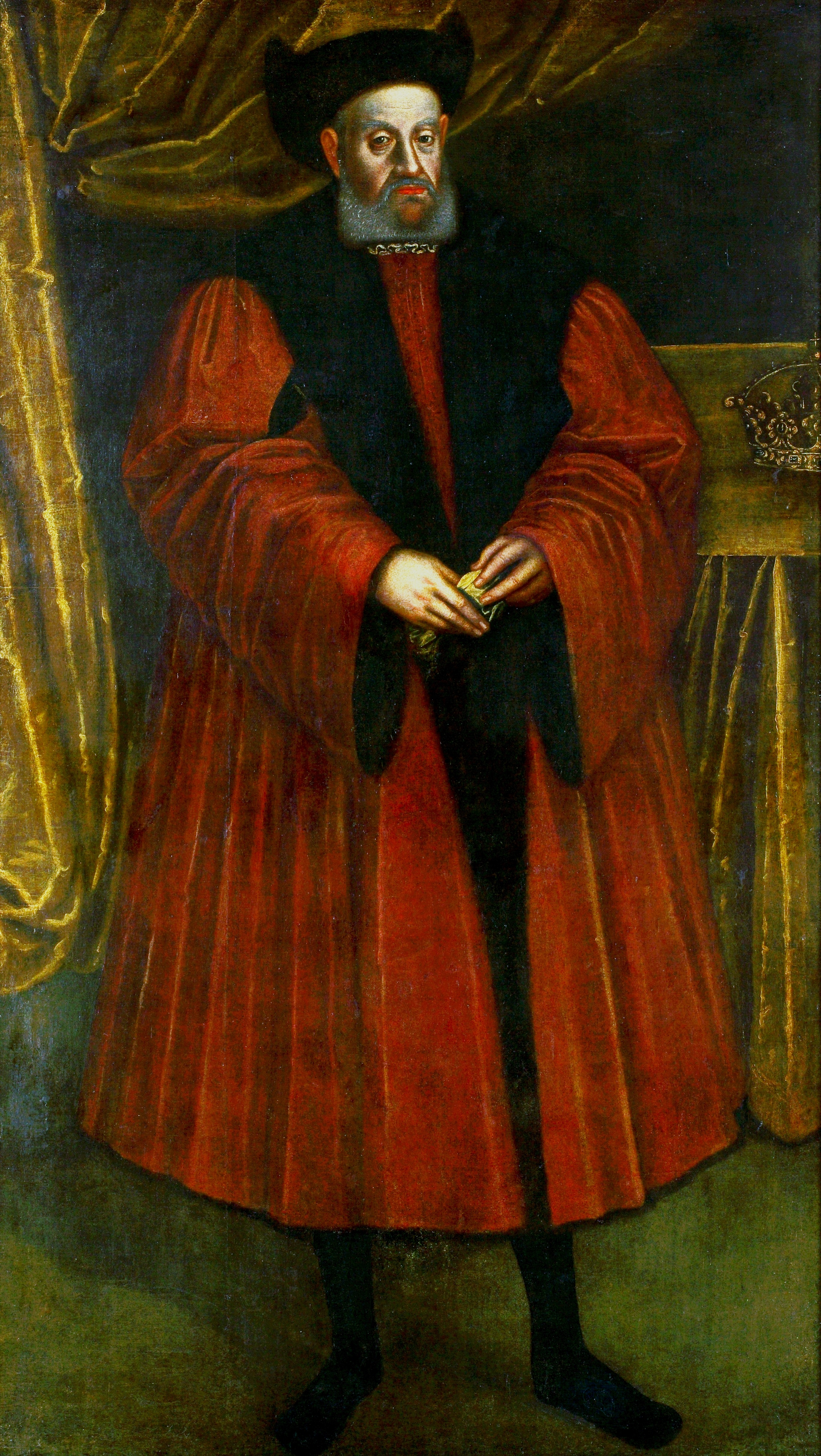
Portrait made by Andreas Jungholz, 1546

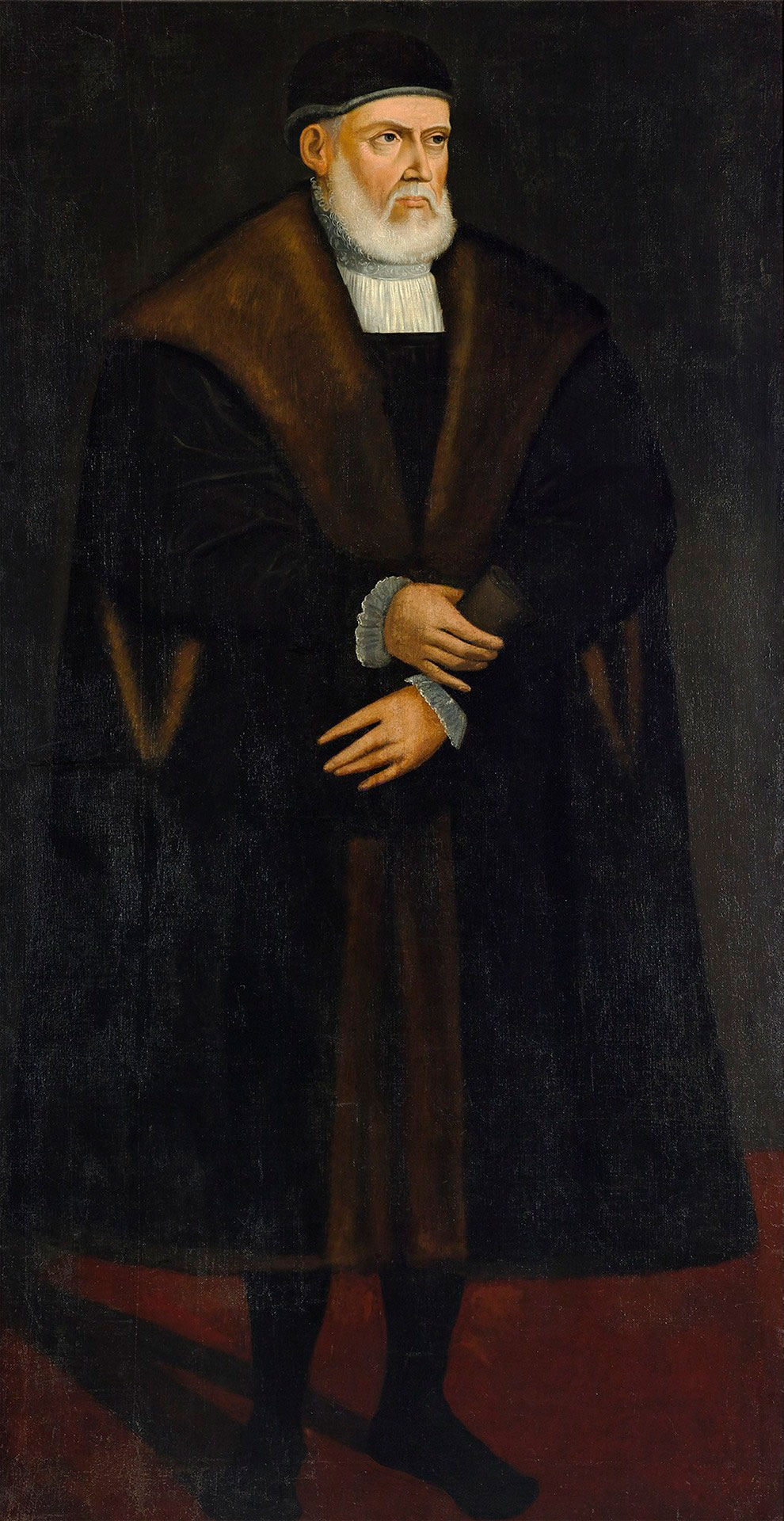
Portrait of Sigismund I in an advanced age by Anonymous Painter, 1550

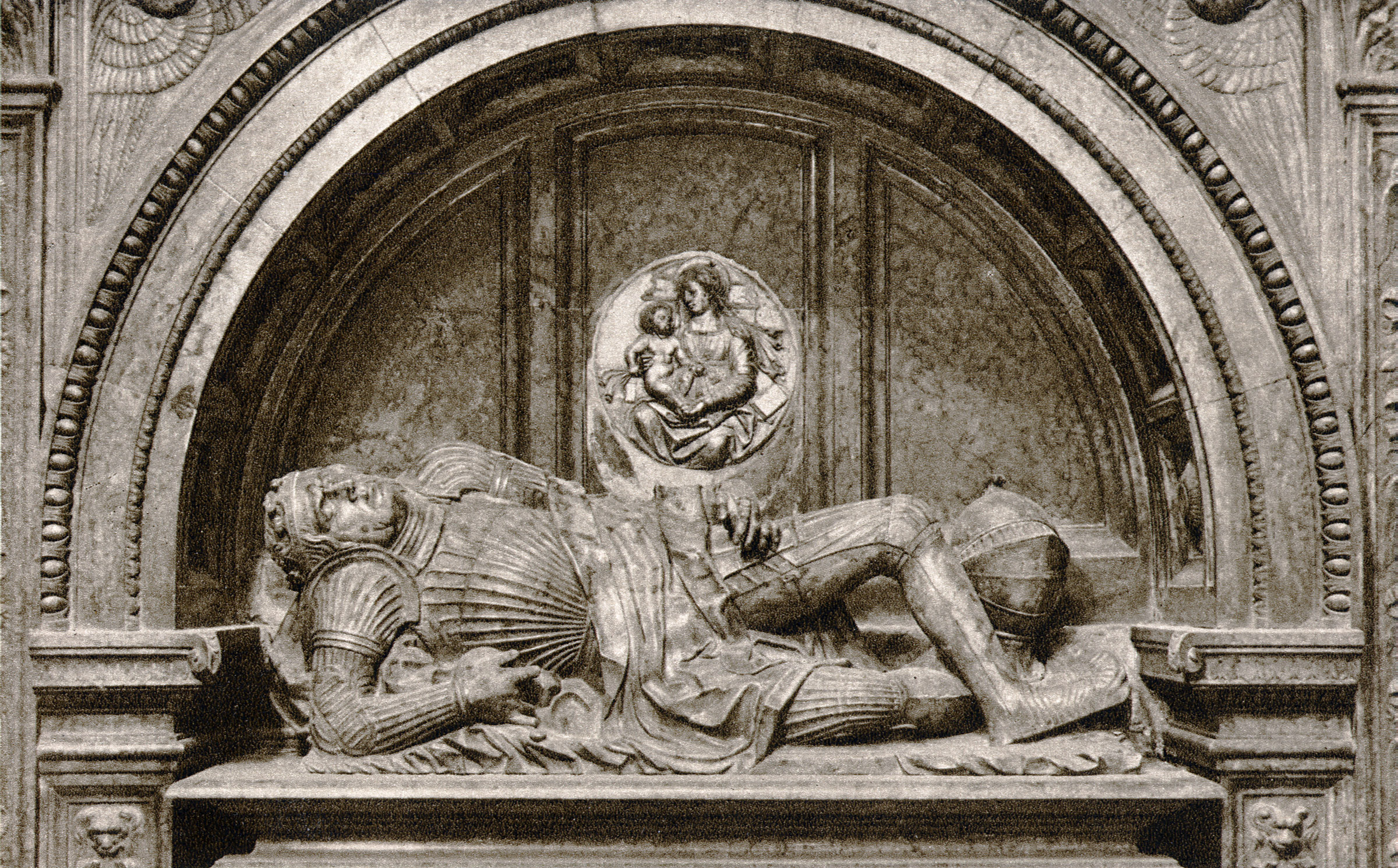
Sigismund I the Old's tomb by Bartolommeo Berrecci, Sigismund's Chapel, Wawel Cathedral

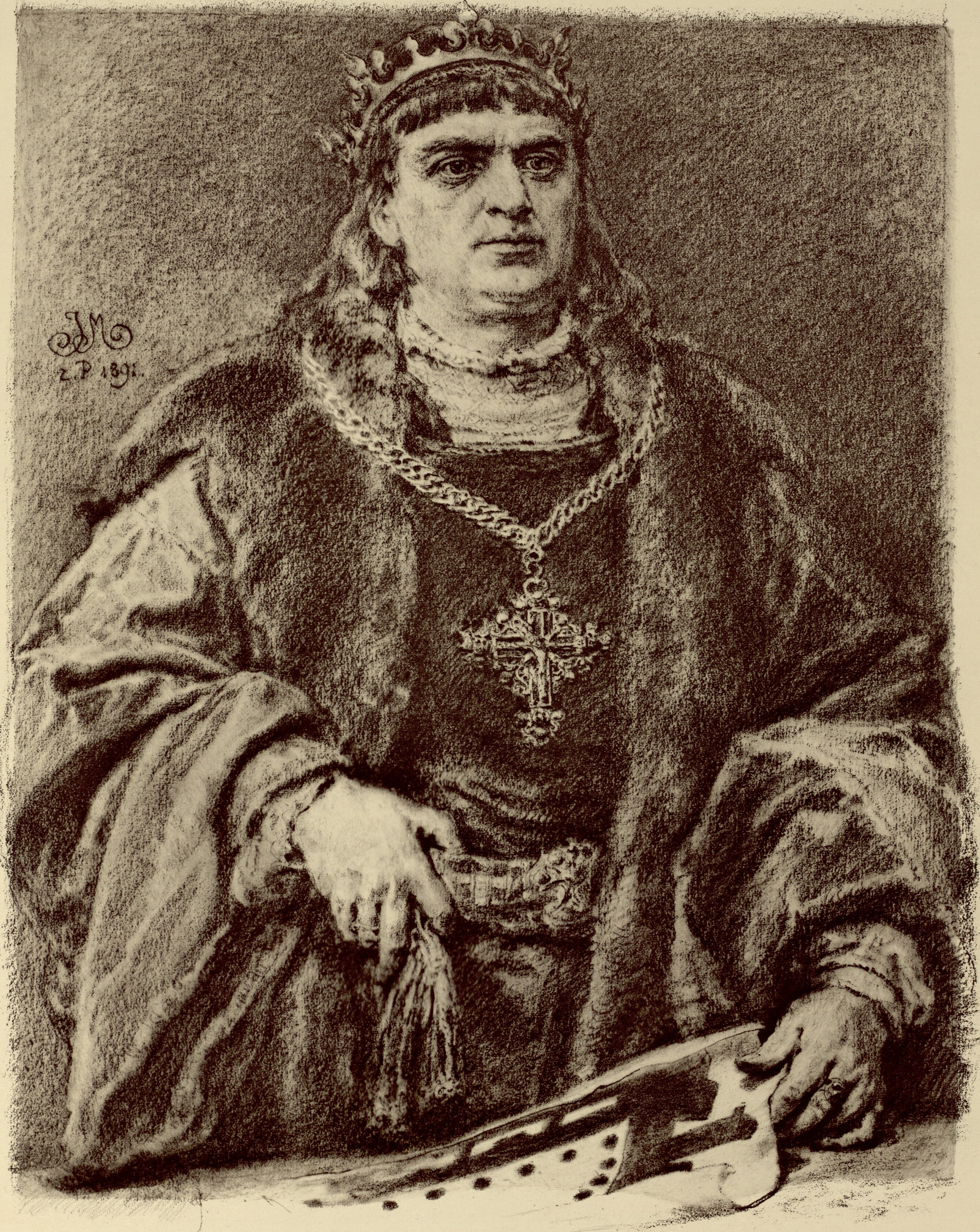
Sigismund I the Old by Jan Matejko, c. 1880

== Marriages and issue ==
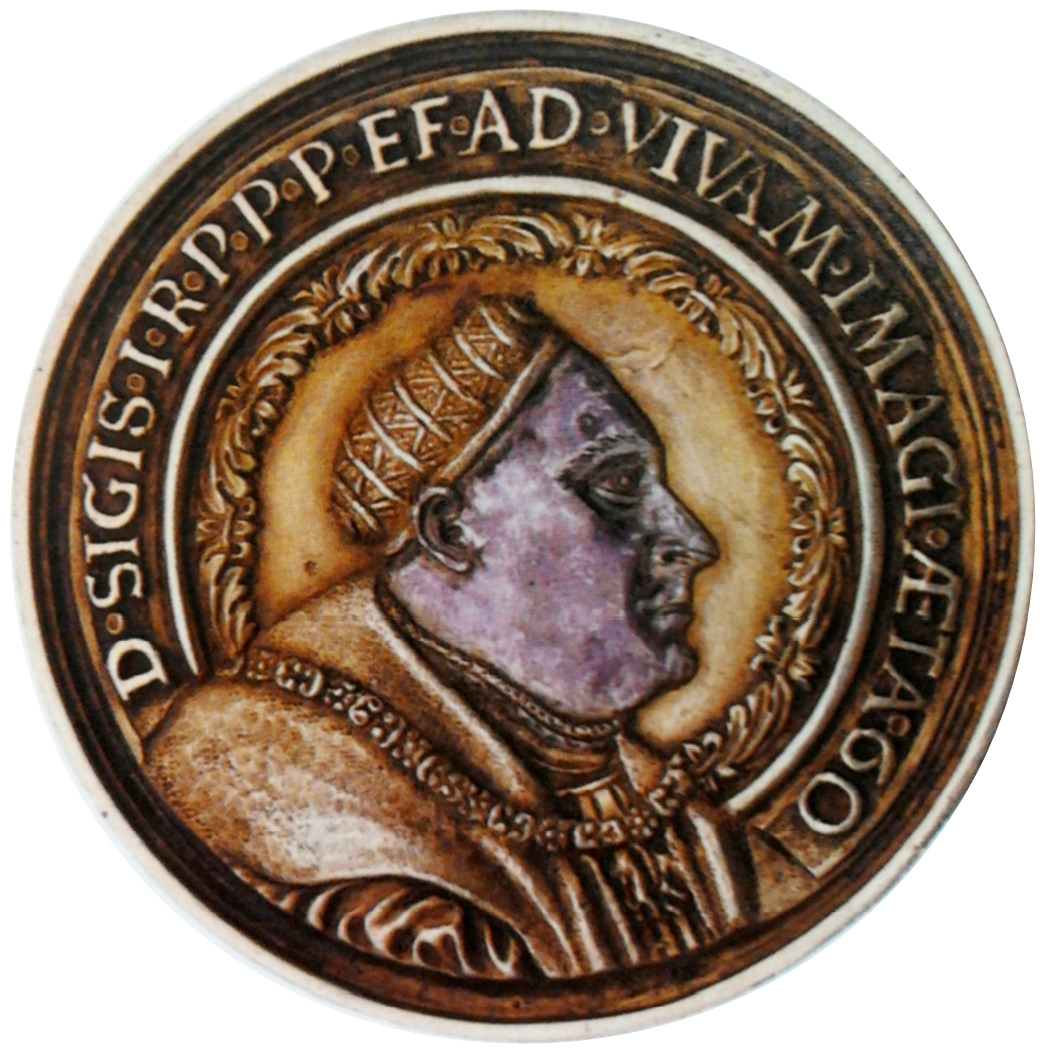
Medal of Sigismund I the Old.

In 1512, Sigismund married Barbara Zápolya (d. 1515), a Hungarian noblewoman, with whom he had two daughters:

- Electress Hedwig of Brandenburg (15 March 1513 – 7 February 1573), wed 1535 Joachim II Hector, Elector of Brandenburg
- Anna (1 July 1515 – 8 May 1520).

In 1517, Sigismund married Bona Sforza, with whom he had two sons and four daughters:

- Queen Isabella of Hungary (18 January 1519 – 15 September 1559), wed 1539 John Zápolya (d. 1540)
- Sigismund II Augustus (1 August 1520 – 7 July 1572)
- Sophia, Duchess of Brunswick-Lüneburg (13 July 1522 – 28 May 1575), wed 22/25 February 1556 Henry V, Duke of Brunswick-Lüneberg (d. 11 June 1568)
- Queen Anna of Poland (18 October 1523 – 9 September 1596), wed 1 May 1576 Stephen Báthory (d. 12 December 1586)
- Queen Catherine of Sweden (1 November 1526 – 16 September 1583), wed 4 October 1562 John, Duke of Finland (later John III of Sweden) (d. 17 November 1592)
- Albertus (or Adalbertus) (born and died 20 September 1527), died as newborn.

By his mistress, Katarzyna Telniczanka (d. 1528), he also fathered three children prior to his first marriage:

- Jan (8 January 1499 – 18 February 1538), Bishop of Wilno (1519–1536) and of Poznań (1536–1538);
- Regina (1500/1501 – 20 May 1526), wed c. 20 October 1518 Hieronim Szafraniec, Starost of Cieszyn (d. 1556/1559);
- Katarzyna (1503 – before 9 September 1548), wed after 1522 George II Count von Montfort in Pfannberg (d. 1544).

== Ancestry ==
Ancestors of Sigismund I the Old

8. Algirdas, King of Lithuania
4. Władysław II Jagiełło, King of Poland
9. Uliana of Tver
2. Casimir IV Jagiellon, King of Poland
10. Andrew Ivanovich, Prince of Halshany
5. Sophia of Halshany
11. Alexandra Dimitrijewna of Drutsk
1. Sigismund I the Old
12. Albert IV, Duke of Austria
6. Albert II of Germany
13. Johanna Sophia of Bavaria
3. Elizabeth of Austria
14. Sigismund, Holy Roman Emperor
7. Elizabeth of Luxembourg
15. Barbara of Cilli

== See also ==
- History of Poland (1385–1569)
- Zygmunt (bell)
- List of Polish monarchs

== Bibliography ==
- Mickūnaitė, Giedrė (2006). Making a Great Ruler: Grand Duke Vytautas of Lithuania. Central European University Press.
- Nowakowska, Natalia, ed. (2019). Remembering the Jagiellonians. Routledge. ISBN 978-1-138-56239-4.
- Pastrnak, Patrik (2018). "Adducimus gemmam et florem: Bona Sforza's bridal journey (1518) in the light of rituals and ceremonies". Studia z Dziejów Średniowiecza. 22: 174–193. doi:10.4467/25442562SDS.18.012.9814.
- Soloviev, Sergei M. (1976). Graham, Hugh F. (ed.). History of Russia. The Age of Vasily III. Vol. 9. Gulf Breeze: Academic International Press. ISBN 978-0875690667.
- Stevens, Carol B. (2007). Russia's Wars of Emergence 1460–1730. Pearson Education. ISBN 978-0-582-21891-8.
- Ostrowski, Jan K. (1992), Cracow (in Polish), International Cultural Centre, ISBN 83-221-0621-1

Sigismund I the Old House of Jagiellon Born: 1 January 1467 Died: 1 April 1548
Regnal titles
Preceded by Alexander Jagiellon	Grand Duke of Lithuania; 1506 – 1548 with Sigismund II Augustus (1529 – 1548)	Succeeded by Sigismund II Augustus as sole ruler
Preceded by Alexander Jagiellon	King of Poland; 1506 – 1548 with Sigismund II Augustus (1529 – 1548)	Succeeded by Sigismund II Augustus as sole ruler
