= Benedykt from Sandomierz =

Polish architect

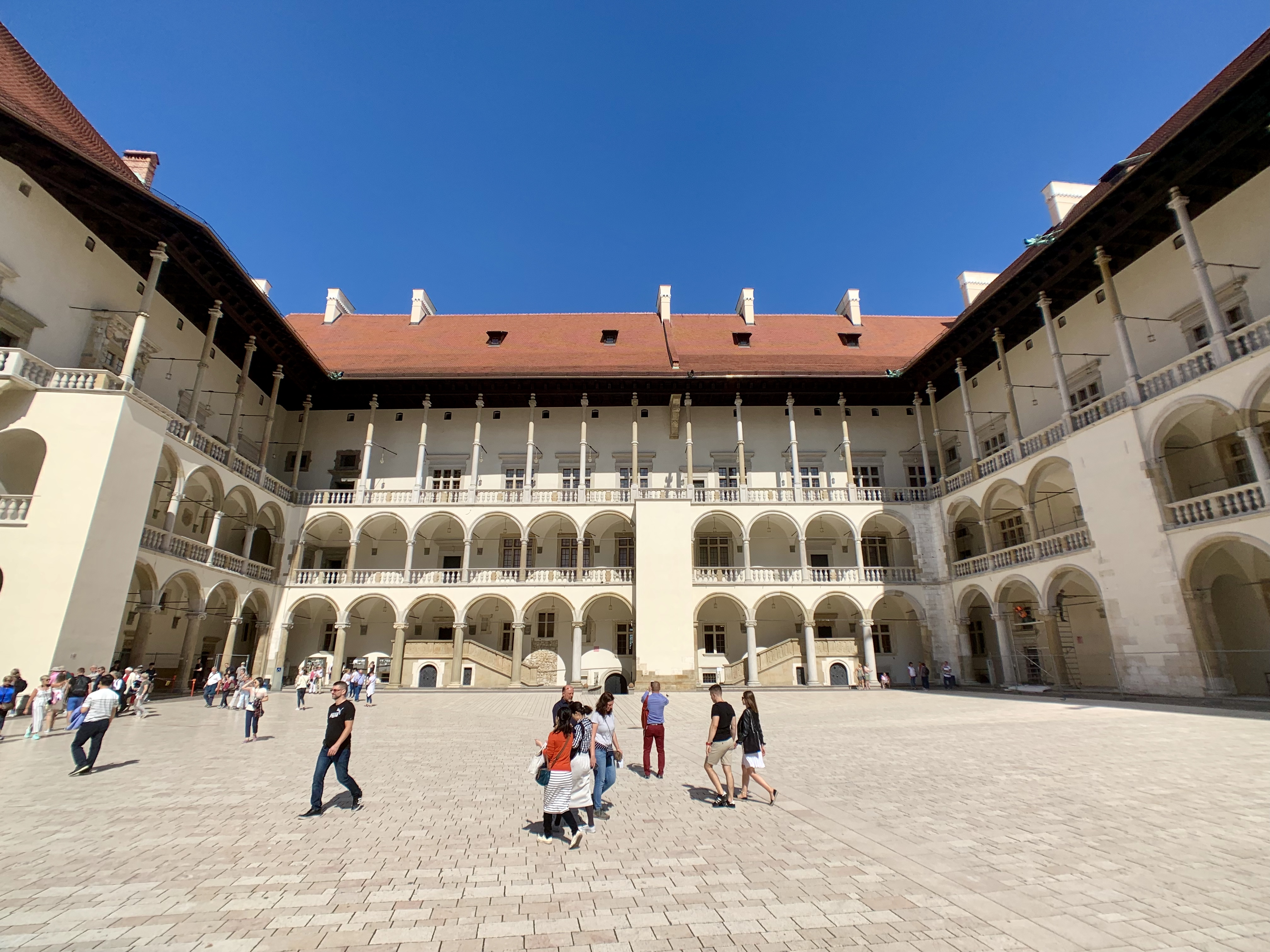
Wawel Castle in Kraków

Benedykt of Sandomierz (Polish: Benedykt z Sandomierza) was a Polish Renaissance architect, who together with Bartolommeo Berrecci rebuilt the royal Wawel Castle in Kraków under the rule of Sigismund I of Poland after it burnt down in 1499.
