= Bartolommeo Berrecci =

Italian architect (1480–1537)

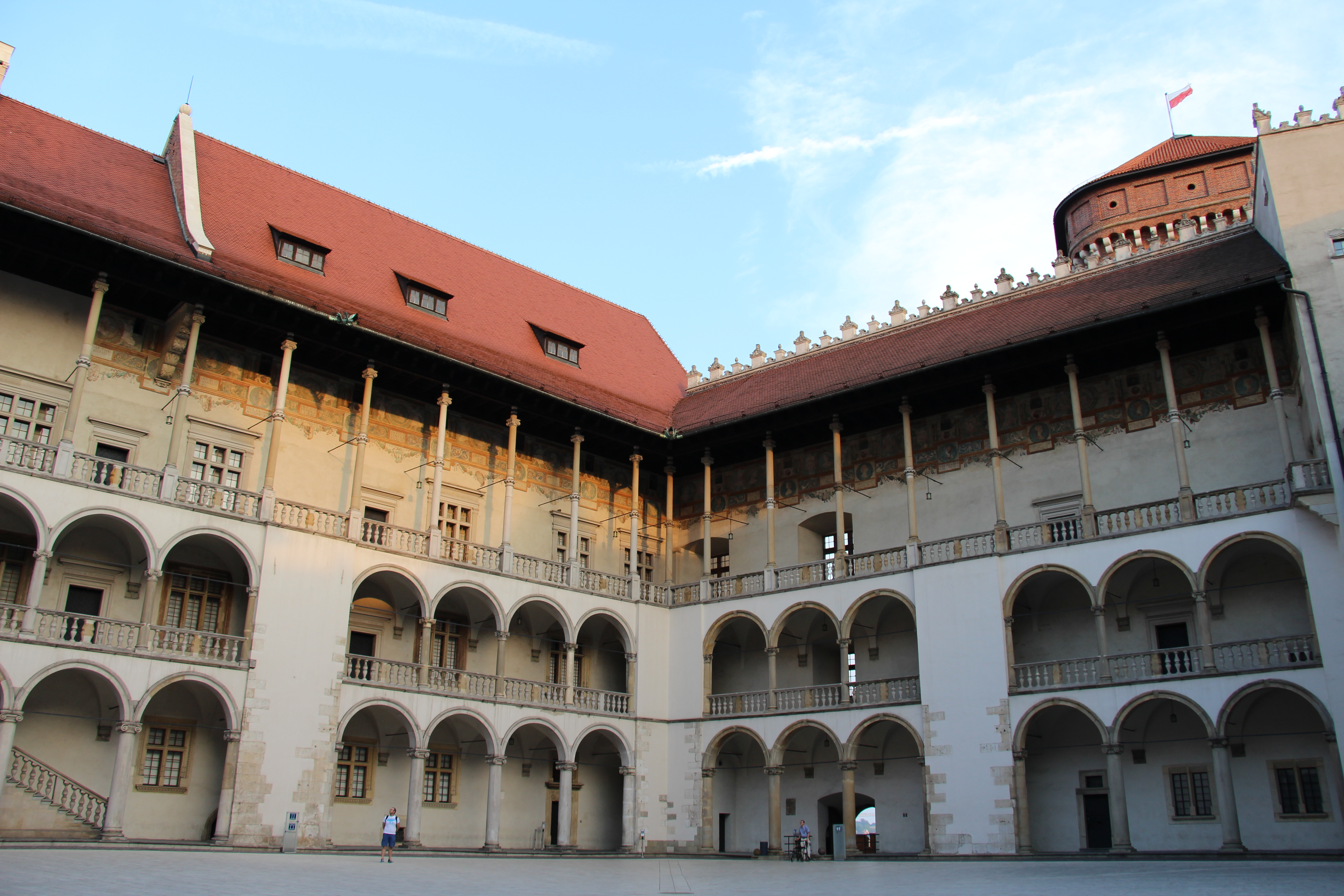
Wawel Castle in Kraków

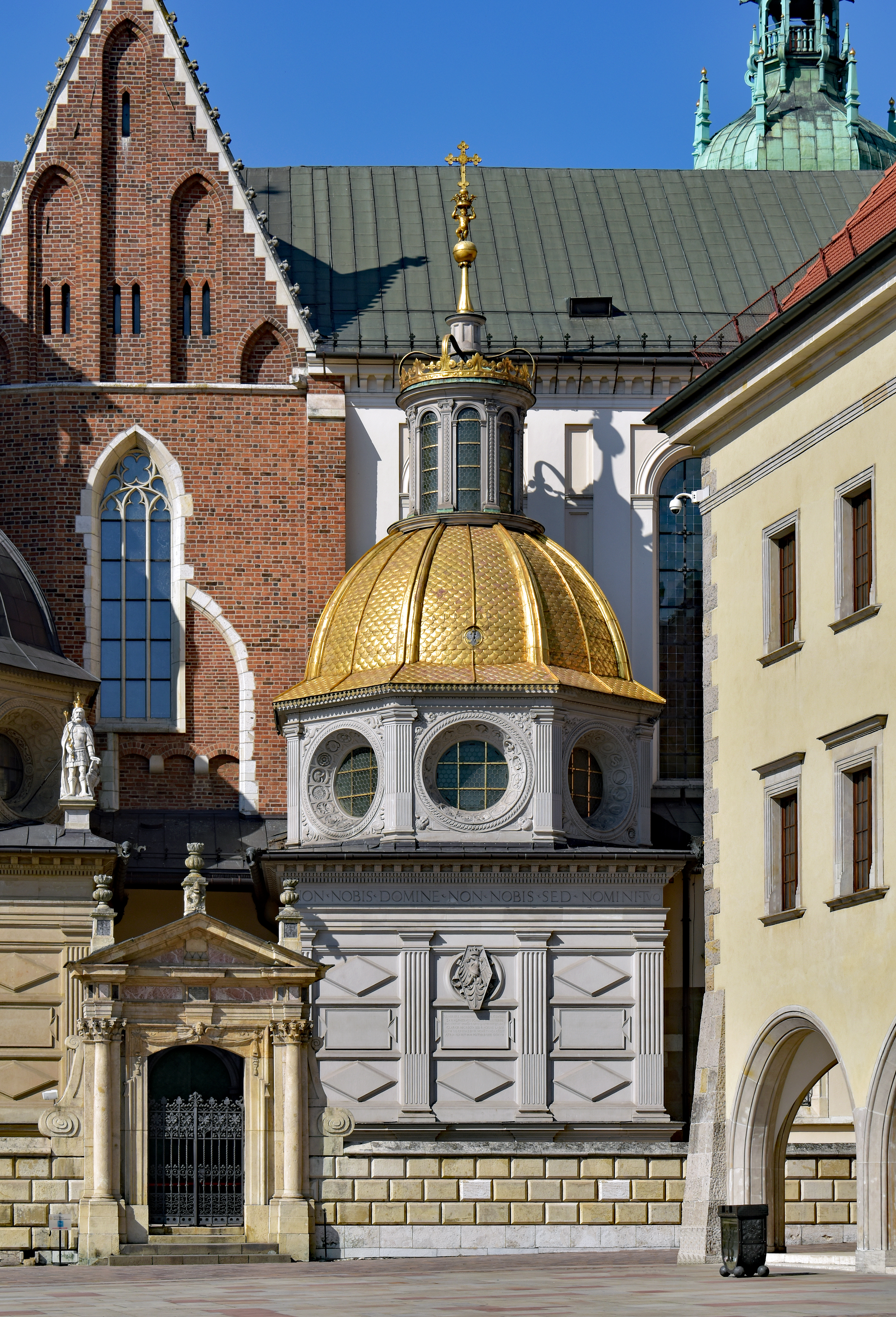
Sigismund Chapel (right)

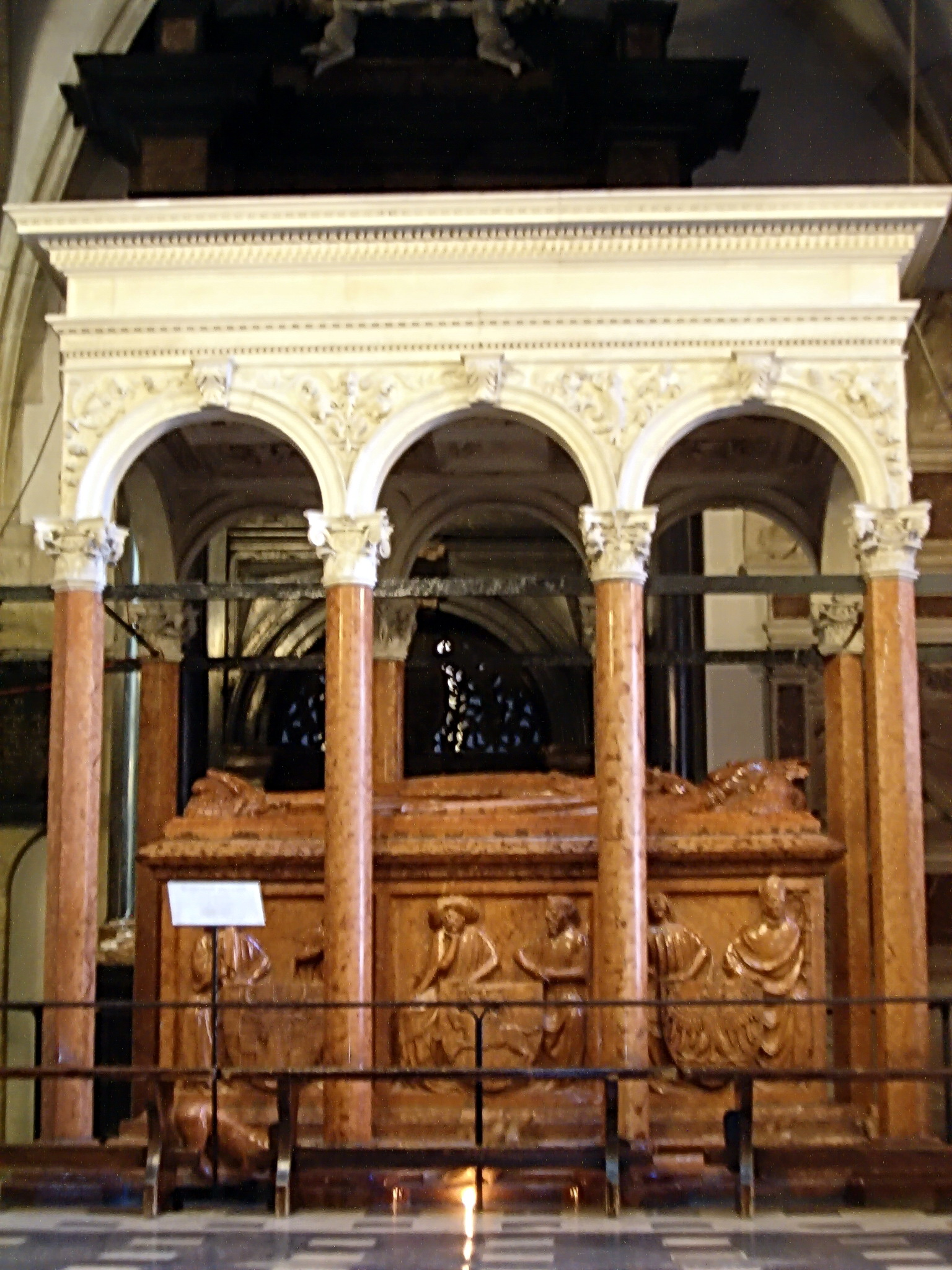
Baldachin for the tomb of Jagiełło

Bartolomeo Berrecci (1480 Pontassieve, Italy – 1537 Kraków, Poland) was an Italian Renaissance architect who spent most of his career in Poland.

== Studies and career in Poland ==
He learned architecture in Florence, first through apprenticeship with his father, who was also an architect. He was then probably taught by Andrea Ferrucci, his father's fellow Florentine architect. He moved to Poland in 1516 at the invitation of the bishop Jan Łaski to take over the work of rebuilding the Wawel Royal Castle in Kraków after the death of Francesco Fiorentino, working with Benedykt from Sandomierz. The castle had burnt down in 1499, and the rebuilding was commissioned by Sigismund I of Poland. He also took over Florentino's workshop, with the artists Bernardino de Gianotis, Giovanni Cini from Siena, Mikołaj Castiglione, and five members of the Soli family.

He worked in Kraków, Niepołomice, Poznań, Tarnów and most likely in Vilnius where the Royal Palace of Lithuania was reconstructed. He became very rich in Poland, owning a number of houses in Kraków and a brickyard. He was murdered in 1537 by another jealous Italian artist in Kraków and was buried in the Corpus Christi Basilica in Kazimierz by Kraków.

== Legacy ==
The most important work of Berrecci is the chapel of the last Jagiellonians, the Sigismund Chapel for King Sigismund I the Old at the Wawel (1517–1533) in Kraków; It is considered to be the most beautiful piece of Italian Renaissance architecture outside of Italy. Some years later Santi Gucci built the tombs of King Sigismund II Augustus and Queen Anna Jagiellon (the son and daughter of Sigismund I) inside the chapel. His death in 1537 was the result of an infection caused by a worksite accident during work on the tomb of Piotr Tomicki.

Berrecci's other works include:

- rebuilding the Wawel royal castle
- extension of the Niepołomice Castle
- baldachin for the tomb of Władysław II Jagiełło
- tomb for the bishops Jan Konarski (died 1525) and Piotr Tomicki (died 1535) in the Wawel Cathedral
- tomb of Barbara Tarnowska and the tombs of the three Jans in the Cathedral in Tarnów.

He is one of the characters on the famous painting by Jan Matejko, Prussian Homage.
