= Francesco Fiorentino =

Francesco Fiorentino may refer to:

- Francesco Fiorentino (sculptor) (died 1516), Italian-born Polish sculptor
- Francesco Fiorentino (philosopher) (1834–1884), Italian philosopher and historiographer
