= Francesco Fiorentino (sculptor) =

Italian architect and sculptor (died 1516)

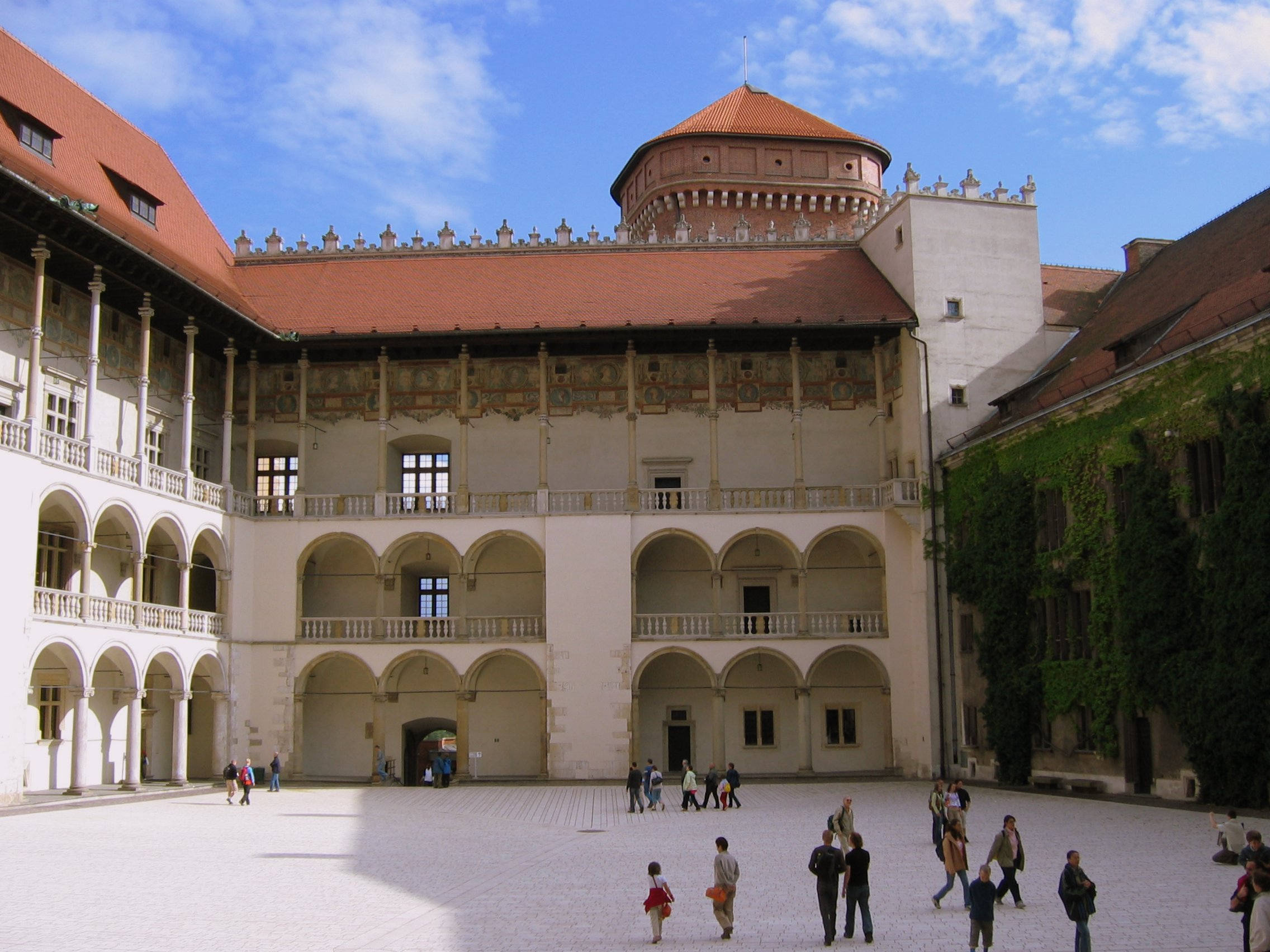
Eberhard Rosemberger and Francesco Florentino - Wawel, Kraków

Francesco the "Florentine" was an Italian Renaissance sculptor from Florence. His date of birth is unknown. He died on 16 October 1516 in Kraków.

== Life ==
This Italian architect was the earliest representative of the renaissance in Poland. There is no information about his life or his work before he arrived there.

He probably appeared for the first time in Kraków in February 1502 at Prince Sigismund's request, and may have come with him from Hungary. Prince Sigismund later became the Grand Duke of Lithuania (20 October 1506 – 1 April 1548) and the King of Poland (24 January 1507 – 1 April 1548) as Sigismund I (commonly referred to as Sigismund I the Old), and was the main promoter of the renaissance style in Poland.

In fact, Prince Sigismund arrived from Hungary not only with Francesco Fiorentino, but with an entire architectural-sculptural team composed mainly of Florentines. Prince Sigismund reportedly offered Fiorentino a one-year service with 100 florins (gold coins from Florence) salary. The prince reportedly set up a studio, which was led by Fiorentino, near his residence. From February 1502, Fiorentino lived and worked in Kraków with exceptions for journeys to Buda, Hungary in 1507 and 1510.

== Works ==
The first work Fiorentino undertook was rebuilding two wings of the royal Wawel Castle, which had burned in 1499. At first he worked on the western wing called "the Queen’s House" (1502-1507), which was intended for the home of dowager Queen Elisabeth, prince Sigismund's mother. It was the first stage of rebuilding this edifice in the renaissance style. The remainder of this rebuilding was bas-relief window frames on the second level of the courtyard side. One of these frames in relief is the setting of the bay window. Afterwards, Fiorentino worked on the northern wing (1507–16).

Fiorentino was the designer of the galleries enclosing the large castle courtyard. It was the most important part (in artistic way) of rebuilding by this Italian man. Building started in 1507, after Fiorentino's death in 1516 it was continued by Bartolomeo Berrecci (1480-1537), and then after his death by his collaborators. This courtyard is considered to be the most beautiful renaissance courtyard in Central Europe. The galleries, which made the main communication area of the building were used to representative and sociable goals. It also enabled royal people assisting in ceremonies and tournaments. The galleries were built on three levels and spread on wing walls of the castle. It has arcades on a first and second levels. It makes impression that it tidy up the courtyard in a spatial way and decorate it. Fiorentino, as a renaissance architect, was deriving from classical art (all'antique), but more freely, such that the architectural order was not in accordance with classical rules. In the highest level, each of the galleries is folding from two stems, which are put up one on the other and connected by knots, which never meet. It has triple function: connecting, crowning and bearing. Worth of comment are also jugs placed on a capitals. This rebuilding changed the Gothic castle into a Renaissance residence.

Another masterpiece by Fiorentino is the niche for the tomb of Jan Olbracht, King of Poland from 1492-1501. This work was founded by Elisabeth of Austria, who was the Polish Queen and Jan Olbracht's mother, and Prince Sigismund, his younger brother. Queen founded tomb after the death of her beloved son (1501). Their contribution mark out border of style ages, which was important not only for Wawel, but for whole Kraków. Probably, after prince Zygmunt and Fiorentino arrived from Hungary, the tomb, with figure of Jan Olbracht on the lid, was already done in the Gothic style by Stanislaw Stwosz (1478-1528) – sculptor and son of Wit Stwosz’s (1448-1533) also sculptor and painter. Later, this tomb was placed into the niche made by Fiorentino. Because of the width of the tomb, the niche had to be made not so small. It had to be very deep, but also not so high. Eventually the niche was really wide, deep and heavy, so it needed even pilasters on the sides of heavily closure. Ornamentation of Jan Olbracht’s monument niche is richly decorated. Therefore, Fiorentine made architectural and sculptural frame for Jan Olbracht’s tomb in Wawel Cathedral (1501-05).

Francesco Fiorentino also made the entrance portal at Bishop E. Ciolek’s palace on 17 Kanoniczna Street in Krakow.

== Style ==
Fiorentino was the main designer and part contractor of his masterpieces. His works are described as "pure" Tuscan renaissance. His realizations are also very precise. It seems, some of his works are inspiration of foreign works. For example, the form of Jan Olbracht’s tomb niche is reminiscent of works by Bernardo Rosselino from earlier in the 15th century. The ornamental form is similar to the decoration of the Palazzo Ducale in Urbino and also other stone works from Hungary.

By composition and ornament details his works are obviously connected with the arts of Florence. His style and origin justified his nickname – Fiorentine.

After his death in 1516, works took over his successor – Bartolomeo Berrecci from Pontassieve, Italy, who was managing works until 1537, when he died. Francesco Fiorentine was (as well as Berrecci and many other artists from their country) outstanding creator and gathered around himself highly qualified workers. He was authority for many, because of his high court function and his masterpieces. He was representative of uniformly Tuscan renaissance style. Artistic works, which began after his death created Italian way of renaissance art in Poland.

His architectural and sculptural activity began development of renaissance art in Poland. His unfinished works were continued by the other Florentines, mainly by Bartolomeo Berrecci.

Fiorentino reportedly had a wife – Helena from Italy – and a son, sculptor Jan Fiorentine, who worked on his father's team.

== Sources ==
- H. i S. Kozakiewiczowie, Renesans w Polsce, wyd. Arkady, Warszawa, 1976
- S. Komornicki, Franciszek Florentczyk i pałac wawelski (Przegląd Historii Sztuki I, Kraków, 1929)
- S. Mossakowski, King Sigismund Chapel at Cracow Cathedral (1515–1533), IRSA, Kraków 2012
- Ostrowski J. Podlecki J., Wawel. zamek i katedra, wyd. Karpaty - Andrzej Łączyński, Kraków, 2004
