= Stańczyk =

Polish court jester (c. 1480 – c. 1560)

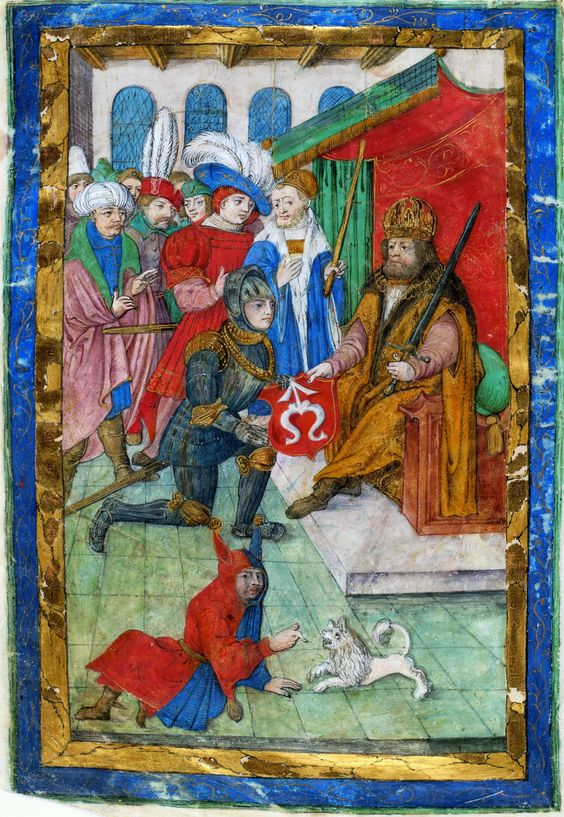
- A 1532 miniature by Stanisław Samostrzelnik depicting a scene at the court of Sigismund I of Poland. The figure on the bottom is presumed to be the only depiction of Stańczyk made in his own lifetime.
- Born: c. 1480
- Died: c. 1560
- Other name: Gąska (possibly)
- Occupation: Jester

Stańczyk (Polish pronunciation: [ˈstaɲt͡ʂɨk]; c. 1480 – c. 1560) was the most famous Polish court jester. He was employed by three subsequent Polish kings: Alexander, Sigismund the Old and Sigismund Augustus, and was praised by his contemporaries for his wit, patriotism and sober political thought, though some historians noted the possible embellishment in the numerous surviving anecdotes. In later generations Stańczyk became an inspiration for Polish political thinkers and a favorite subject of several artists, most notably the painter Jan Matejko, who made him the central figure of many of his paintings, including the famous "Stańczyk" painting. Stańczyk is often cited as an archetypical example of a wise fool or to illustrate the sad clown paradox.

== Name, identity and historicity ==
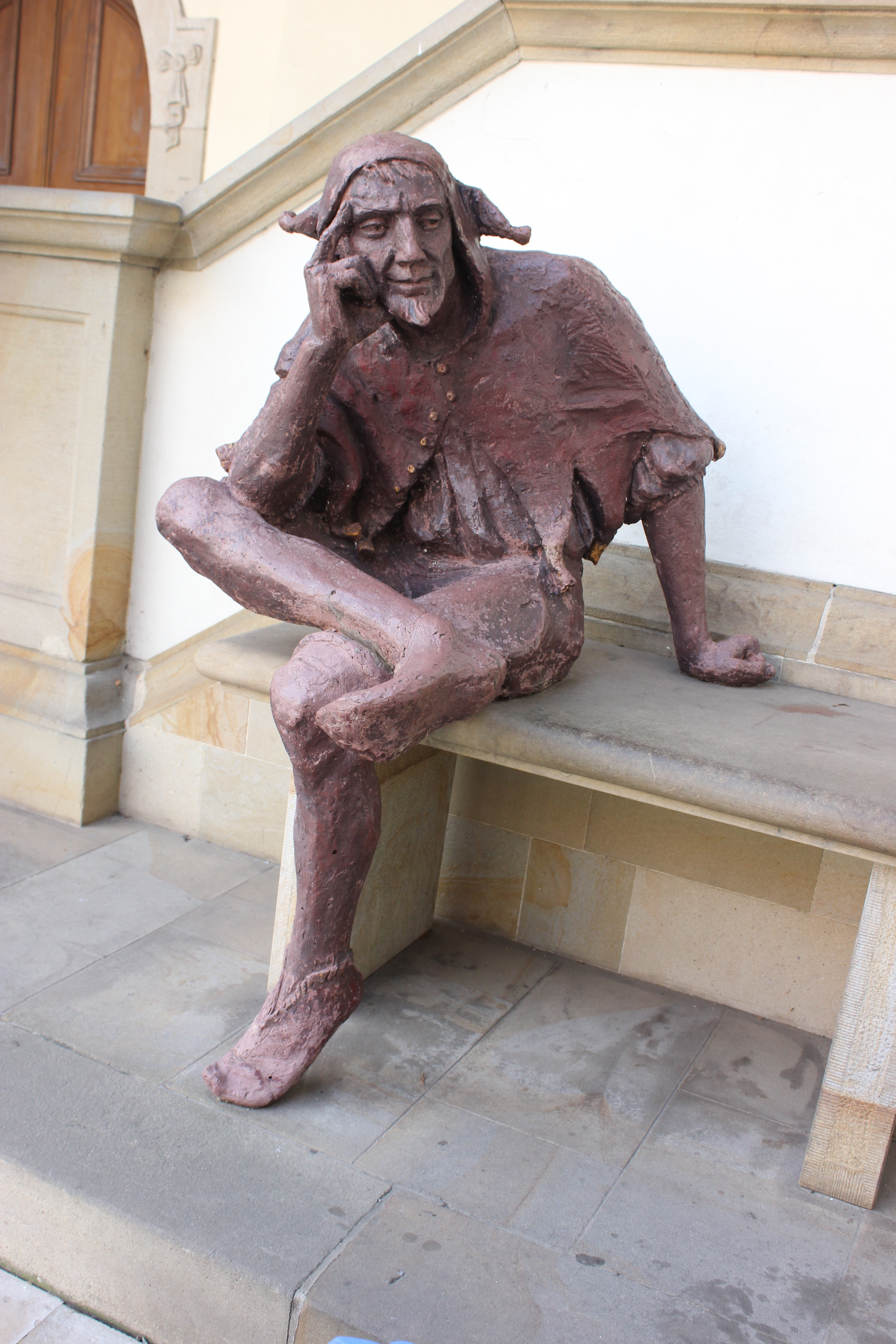
Modern statue of Stańczyk in Niepołomice Castle, a former royal residence

Almost nothing is known about Stańczyk's life aside from numerous anecdotes written down by contemporary Renaissance writers. As such even his name and exact identity are a matter of dispute. Contemporary sources mention court jesters named Gąska and Stańczyk. Both words are not proper names in their own right but diminutives, of words gęś (goose) and the masculine name Stanisław, respectively. As these two names are contemporary but never appear together, this led Aleksander Brückner and later scholars to believe that Gąska and Stańczyk are merely two nicknames or stage names of the same person. In modern sources Stańczyk is sometimes referred to as Stanisław Gąska, a name that was coined by combining the two nicknames into what resembles a proper Polish name. However, such name have never been recorded during the jester's times.

Stańczyk is conjectured to have been born in Proszowice near Kraków. Despite his occupation, he was likely a nobleman. He may be the same person as rotmistrz Stańczyk, a military officer mentioned as active during the reigns of John I Albert and Alexander I Jagiellon. If so, he may have obtained employment at court as resident entertainer after ending his military career, perhaps prematurely due to injuries. Stańczyk is mentioned as still alive in 1556, but Mikołaj Rej refers to him as already deceased in his poetry book published in 1562.

Historiographies of the 19th century postulated that Stańczyk was a fictional character entirely invented as a literary device by Jan Kochanowski and other intellectuals active at the Polish court. Alternatively, it has been postulated that Stańczyk was just a regular court jester who, without his own knowledge, was given the characteristics of a "wise fool" by contemporary literature for polemical purposes. Nevertheless, it is currently widely accepted that not only Stańczyk was a real person, but that he also had a real-life reputation among his contemporaries. Due to his service spanning decades and covering reigns of three kings, he became somewhat of a permanent fixture of the royal court in Kraków.

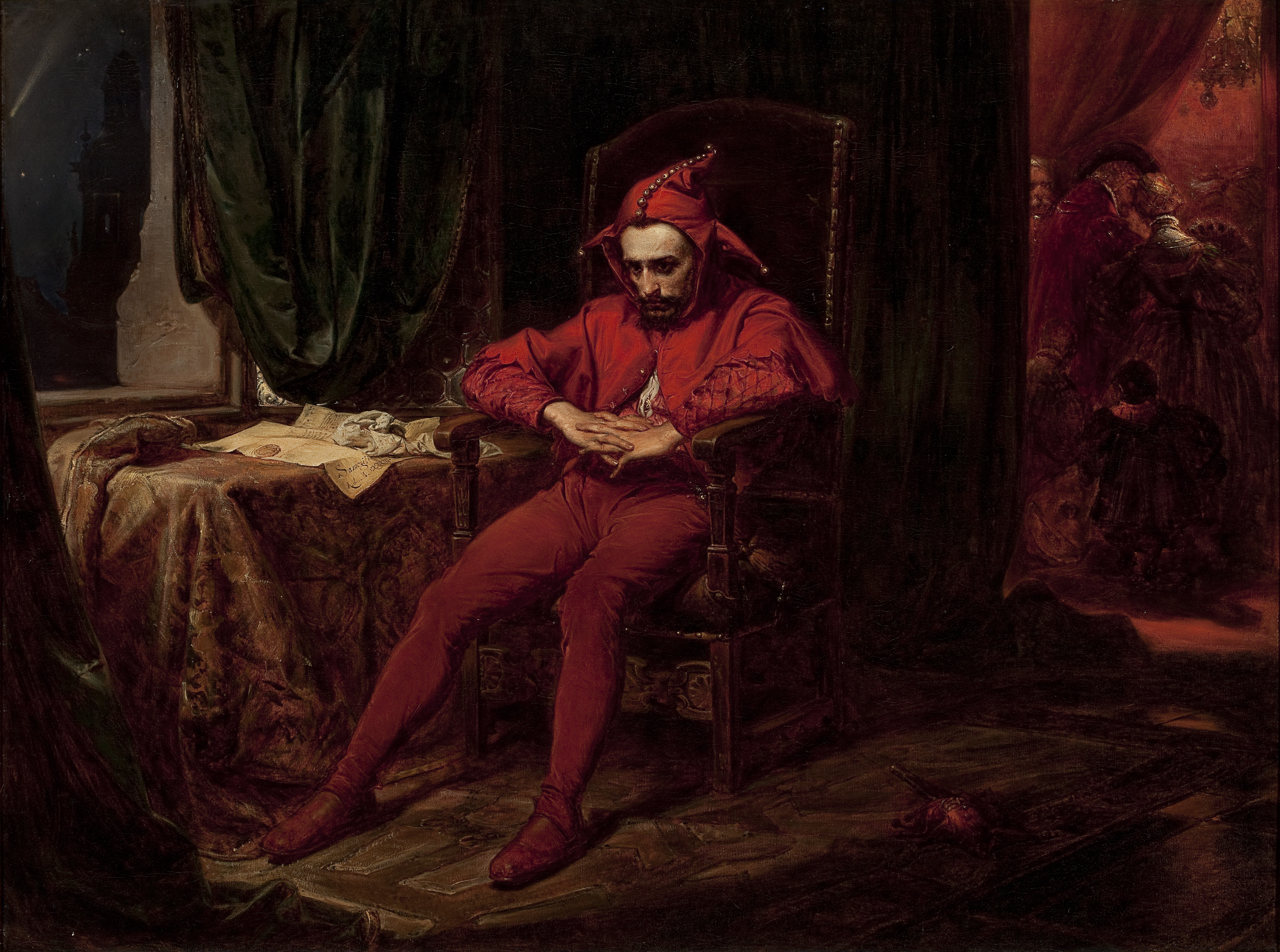
Stańczyk by Jan Matejko The jester is depicted as the only person at a royal ball troubled by the news that the Muscovites have captured Smolensk, which happened in 1514.

Stańczyk acquired a circle of well positioned friends and some sources even go as far as to call him a personal friend to Marcin Kromer, personal secretary to king Sigismund I the Old. He was also acquainted with many other political figures of his age and with many Renaissance humanists including Łukasz Górnicki, Jan Kochanowski, Marcin Kromer, and Mikołaj Rej. As a resident jester he also had unique, personal access to the royal family.

== Anecdotes ==
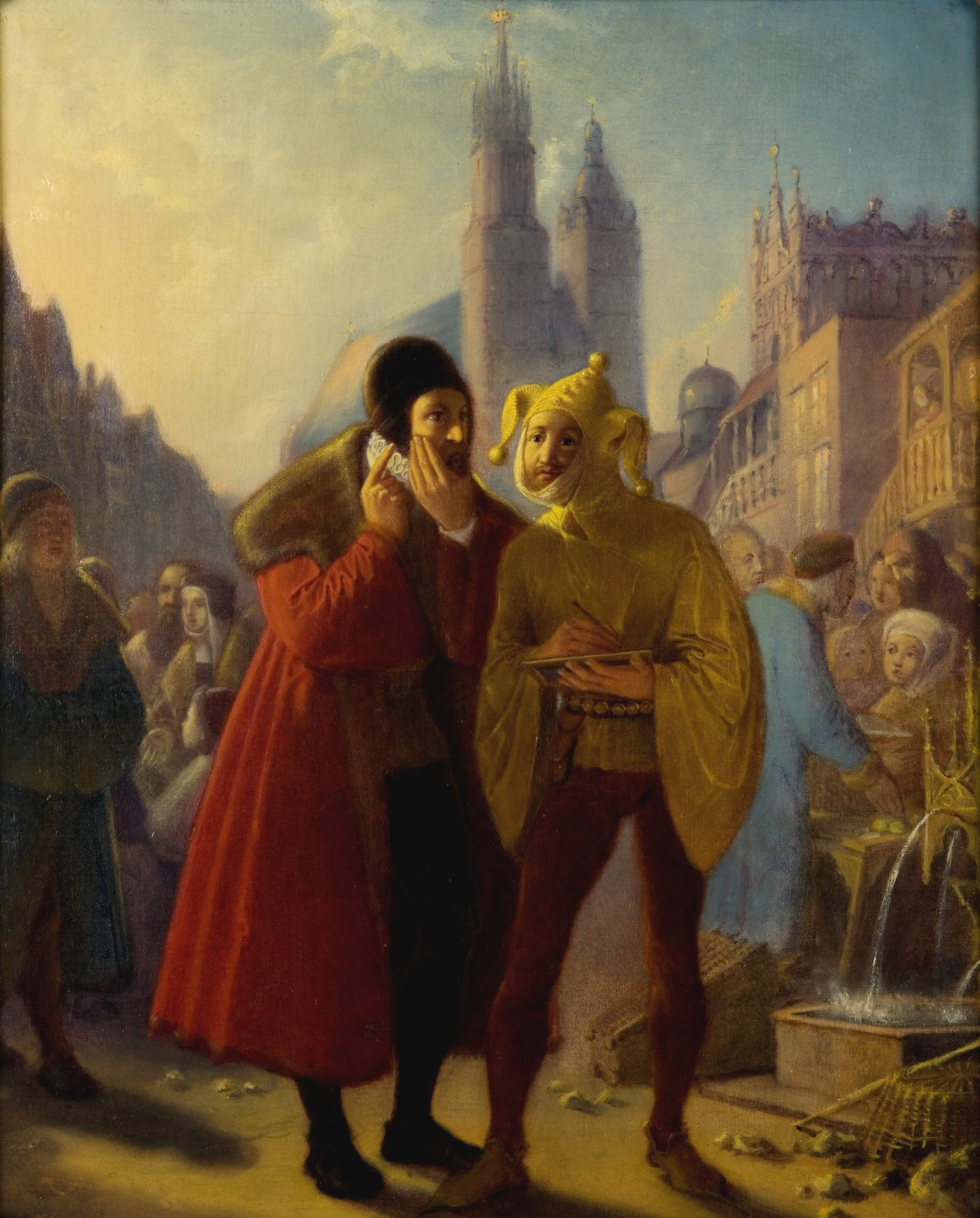
Jan Matejko, Stańczyk Feigning a Toothache, 1856, The National Museum in Kraków.

Various anecdotes about Stańczyk were preserved by numerous contemporary writers and historians. In these anecdotes, Stańczyk is usually praised as a patriot with great intellect and the gift of foresight, yet at the same time skeptical about the country's situation, its people and its future prosperity. He used his position and Jester's privilege to lampoon and prank contemporary political figures, going as far as poking fun at the king's own decisions.

The best known anecdote about Stańczyk is that of a hunting incident. In 1527 King Sigismund the Old had a huge bear brought for him from Lithuania. The bear was released in the forest of Niepołomice near Kraków so that the king could hunt it. During the hunt, the animal charged at the king, the queen and their courtiers which caused panic and mayhem. Queen Bona fell from her horse which resulted in her miscarriage. Later, the king mocked Stańczyk for having run away instead of fighting with the bear as his knightly status commanded. The jester is said to have replied that "a greater fool lets out a bear that was already in a cage". This remark is often interpreted as an allusion to the king's conciliatory policies towards Poland's enemies, most notably Prussia which was defeated by Poland but not fully incorporated into the Crown and Russia, a massive victory over which was not followed upon.

In another story Stańczyk, who liked to stroll around Kraków in his colorful, checkered jester's robe, was once beaten by street urchins who tore his garments. When the king ridiculed him at the court for this, Stańczyk replied that the king was allowing himself to be stripped even worse because Smolensk had been taken from him in the war and he was doing nothing about it..

Stańczyk also made a bet with the king about what was the most common profession in Poland. To the king's surprise, the jester insisted it was a doctor. To prove his point, Stańczyk tied a scarf around his face, feigning a toothache. Everyone he met advised him on how to treat the toothache, showing to the king that everyone in the country considered themselves a doctor.

Stańczyk was famous for his dislike of ecclesiastic officials. He for instance claimed that there was no bigger liars in the kingdom than archbishop of Gniezno Piotr Gamrat and bishop of Kraków Samuel Maciejowski. According to Stańczyk the former claimed to know everything - and yet knew nothing, while the latter claimed to know nothing - and yet knew everything.

== Stańczyk as a symbol ==
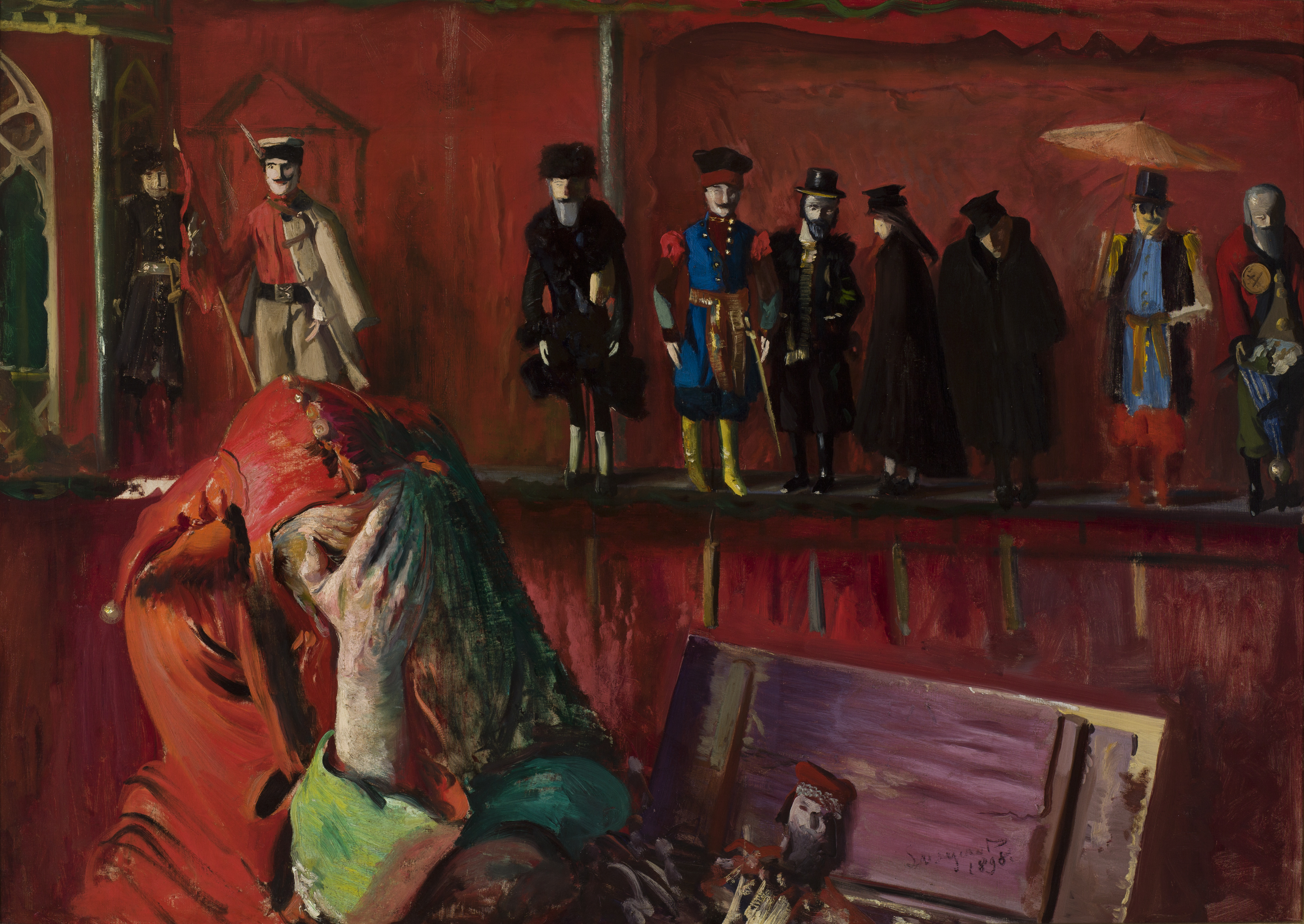
Stańczyk by Leon Wyczółkowski. Oil on canvas, National Museum in Kraków

Forgotten soon after his death, Stańczyk's popularity returned in the 19th century and he remains a household name in Poland to present times. Unlike jesters of other European courts, Stańczyk has been always considered much more than a mere entertainer.

Stańczyk became a popular historical figure in Polish literature after the partitions (1795). Some writers treated him as a symbol of Poland's struggle for independence, others provided him with rather Shakespearean traits. He appears in a work of, among others, Julian Ursyn Niemcewicz (in Jan z Tęczna. Powieść historyczna, 1825) and several works by Józef Ignacy Kraszewski (1839, 1841).

=== Teka Stańczyka ===
In 1869 a group of young conservative publicists: Józef Szujski, Stanisław Tarnowski, Stanisław Koźmian and Ludwik Wodzicki, published a series of satirical pamphlets entitled Teka Stańczyka (Stańczyk's Portfolio or Stańczyk's Files). Only five years after the tragic end of the January Uprising, the pamphlets ridiculed the idea of armed national uprisings and suggested a compromise with Poland's enemies, especially the Austrian Empire, and more concentration on economic growth than on political independence. The political faction which adopted these ideas became known as "Stańczycy" (plural of "Stańczyk").

=== Stańczyk in the arts ===
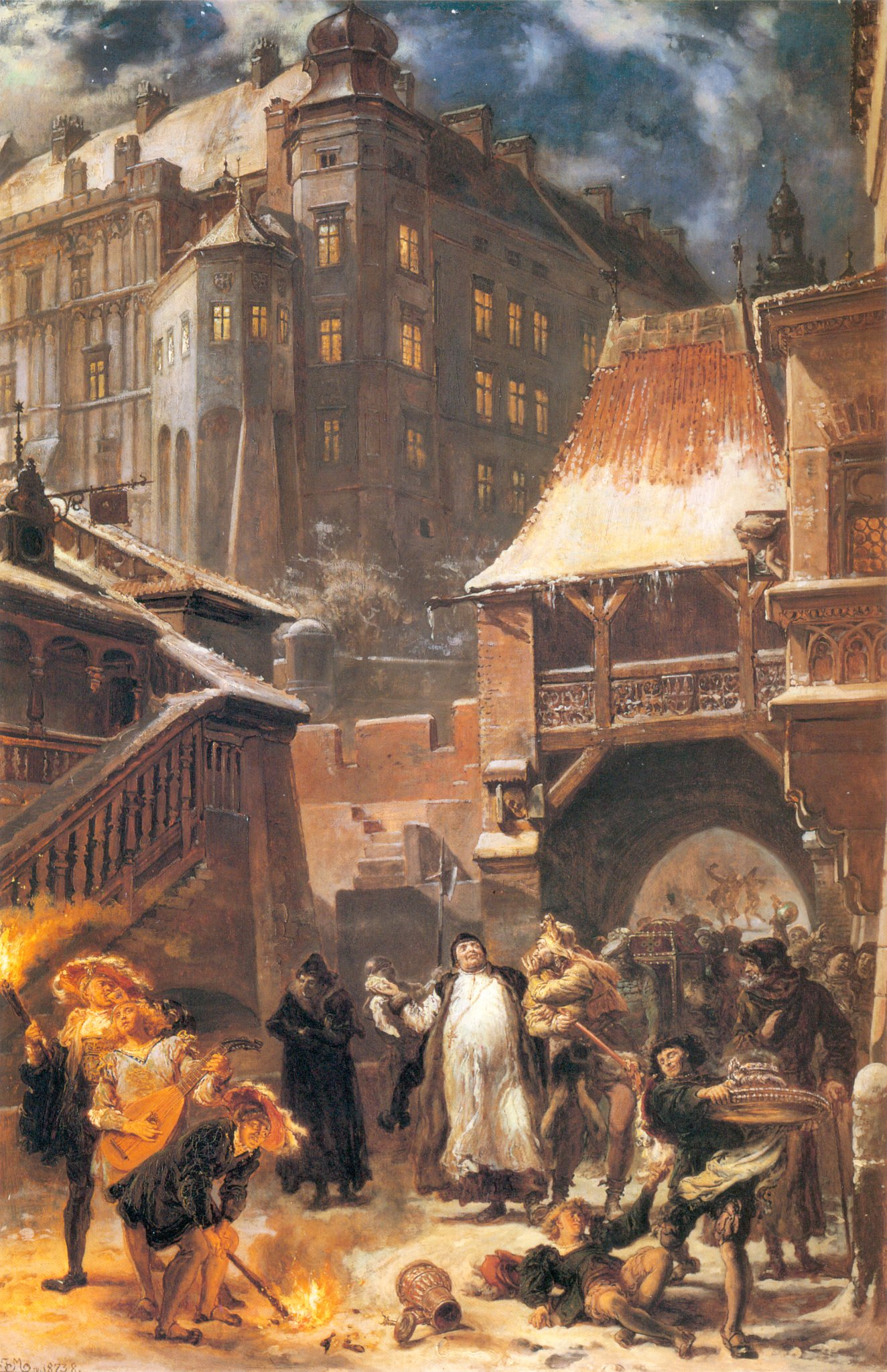
Gamrat and Stańczyk, oil on wood, by Jan Matejko. Kościuszko Foundation, New York

Stańczyk was one of Jan Matejko's favorite historical figures and appears in a number of his paintings, such as Stańczyk, Hanging of the Sigismund Bell, and Prussian Homage. Matejko, giving the jester his own facial features, created the popular image of Stańczyk that is familiar to most modern Poles. The painter always depicted Stańczyk with a very concerned and reflective look on his face, in stark contrast to his cap and bells and other jester's gear. Matejko's vision of Stańczyk influenced the way other artists, such as Leon Wyczółkowski, later depicted the jester.

The most notable appearance of Stańczyk in literature is in Stanisław Wyspiański's play Wesele (The Wedding) where the jester's ghost visits the Journalist, a character modeled after Rudolf Starzewski, editor of the Kraków-based paper Czas (Time), associated with the Stańczycy faction. In the play, Stańczyk accuses the Journalist, who calls the jester a "great man", of inactivity and passive acceptance of the nation's fate. At the end of their conversation, Stańczyk gives the Journalist his "caduceus" (the jester's marotte) and tells him to "stir the nation" but not to "tarnish the sacred things, for sacred they must remain". Thus Wyspiański reinforced Stańczyk's role as a symbol of patriotism and skeptical political wisdom.

Stańczyk is also prominently featured in a 1908 painting entitled Reality by the Polish Symbolist painter Jacek Malczewski.
