= Stanisław Tarnowski =

Polish nobleman

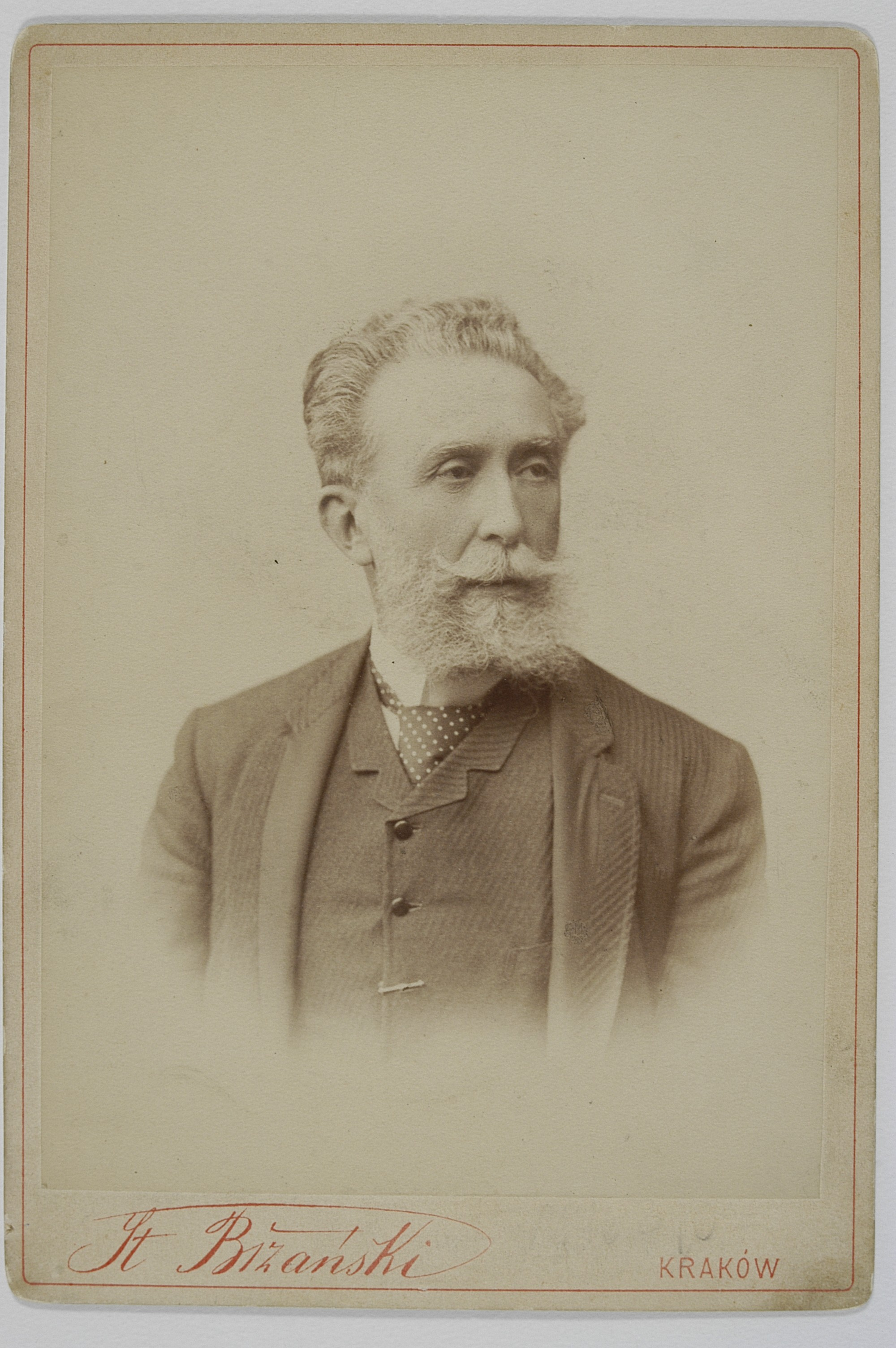
- Portrait of Tarnowski, 1890
- Coat of arms: Leliwa
- Born: 7 November 1837; Dzików, Kingdom of Galicia and Lodomeria, Austrian Empire
- Died: 31 December 1917 (aged 80); Kraków, Kingdom of Galicia and Lodomeria, Austria-Hungary
- Buried: Sanctuary of Our Lady of Dzików
- Noble family: Tarnowski
- Spouse: Róża Maria Branicka
- Father: Jan Bohdan Tarnowski
- Mother: Gabriela née Małachowska
- Board member of: Polish Academy of Arts and Sciences; Polish Historical Society

Academic background
- Education: Imperial and Royal St. Anne's Gymnasium; Jagiellonian University
- Thesis: Król Stanisław Leszczyński jako pisarz polityczny (1870)
- Doctoral advisor: Karol Mecherzyński

Academic work
- Institutions: Jagiellonian University
- Doctoral students: Marian Zdziechowski
- Notable works: Teka Stańczyka

Signature
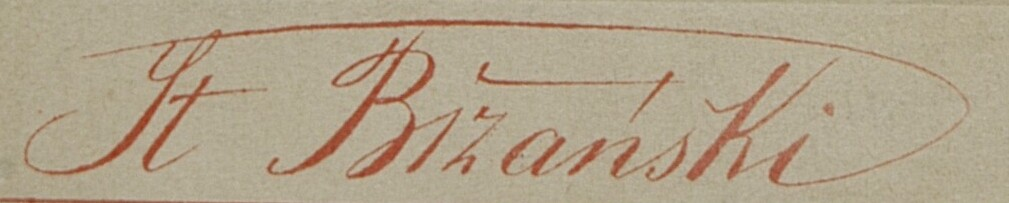

Count Stanisław Tarnowski (7 November 1837 – 31 December 1917) was a Polish nobleman (szlachcic), historian, literary critic and publicist.

== Life ==
He was born on 7 November 1837 and hailed from an aristocratic family. His father was Jan Bogdan and mother Gabriela née Małachowska. He had two brothers: Jan and Juliusz. He attended St. Anne Gymnasium between 1850–1854 and later studied law and philology at the Jagiellonian University (1855–1858). In the course of his studies he made several trips abroad including to Egypt and the Holy Land. He continued his philological education in Vienna and became involved in the activities of Hotel Lambert. During his stay in Paris he worked in the political bureau of the organization and collaborated with Julian Klaczko and Valerian Kalinka.

During the January Uprising, Tarnowski was connected with the Biali (White) liberal-conservative political faction. He was imprisoned from 1863 to 1865 by the Austrian authorities. After his release from prison in Olomouc, he returned to the country and together with Stanisław Koźmian, Józef Szujski and Ludwik Wodzicki he founded the Przegląd Polski quarterly. The first copy was issued on 1 July 1866.

In 1868, he co-authored Teka Stańczyka, a series of satirical pamphlets on the political situation in Galicia published in the Przegląd magazine.

From 1867 Tarnowski served as member of the Sejm in Galicia. In 1885 he became a member of the Herrenhaus in Vienna.

Between 1871 and 1909, he was a professor and twice Rector of Jagiellonian University. From 1873 he was a member, and from 1890 to 1917 chairman, of the Akademia Umiejetnosci (Polish Academy of Learning).

He died in 1918 in Kraków and was buried at the Rakowicki Cemetery in the Branicki family tomb. In 1937, his family transferred his body to the Sanctuary of Our Lady of Dzików in his hometown.

== Works ==
- Frycz Modrzewski o poprawie Rzeczypospolitej (1867)
- Rozprawa o Juliuszu Słowackim (1867)
- O Łukaszu Górnickim (1868)
- O Piotrze Grabowskim (1869)
- O korespondencyi Mickiewicza (1870)
- O księdzu Kaysiewiczu (1873)
- O Krzysztofie Warszewickim (1874)
- Pisarze polit. XVI w. (t. 1-2 1886) OL 1514155W
- Ksiadz Waleryan Kalinka (1887) OL 1514144W
- Jan Kochanowski (1888)
- Zygmunt Krasiński (1892) OL 10711598W
- Matejko (1897) OCLC 830173548
- Julian Klaczko (t. 1-2 1909)OL 1514142W
- Studia o A. Fredrze, H. Rzewuskim, H. Sienkiewiczu, zbiór Rozprawy i sprawozdania (t. 1-4 1895–1898) OL 13111807W
- Synteza Historia literatury polskiej (t. 1-5 1900, t. 6 cz. 1-2 1905–1907)
- Julian Klaczko (1909)
- Wybór studiów O literaturze polskiej XIX wieku (1977). OL 1514146W

== Honours ==
- Order of Franz Joseph (Austria)
- Imperial Order of Leopold (Austria)
- Decoration for Science and Art (Austria-Hungary)
- Litteris et Artibus (Sweden)
- Order of Pope Pius IX (Vatican)
- Order of Polonia Restituta (Poland)

== Gallery ==
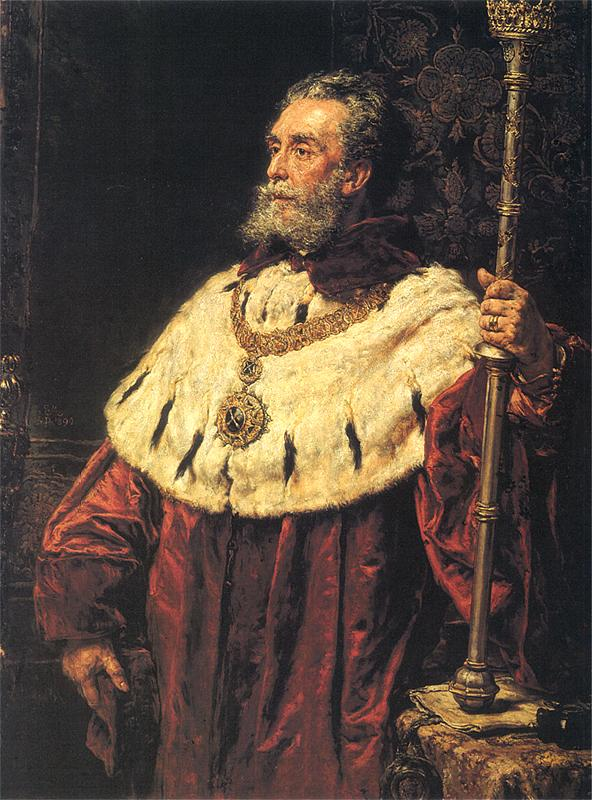
Stanisław Tarnowski as Rector of Jagiellonian University by Jan Matejko

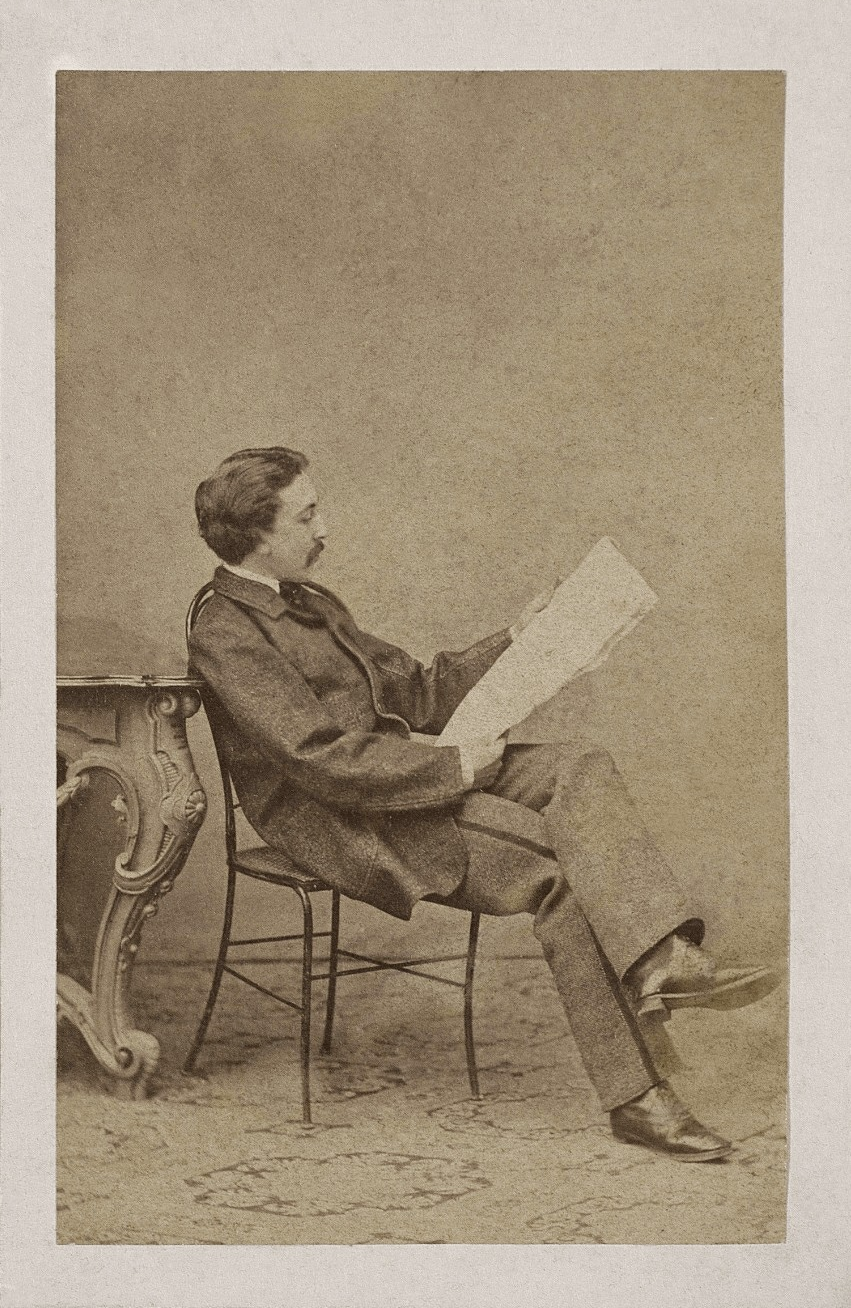
Stanisław Tarnowski, photo made by Ludwig Angerer in Vienna in 1863

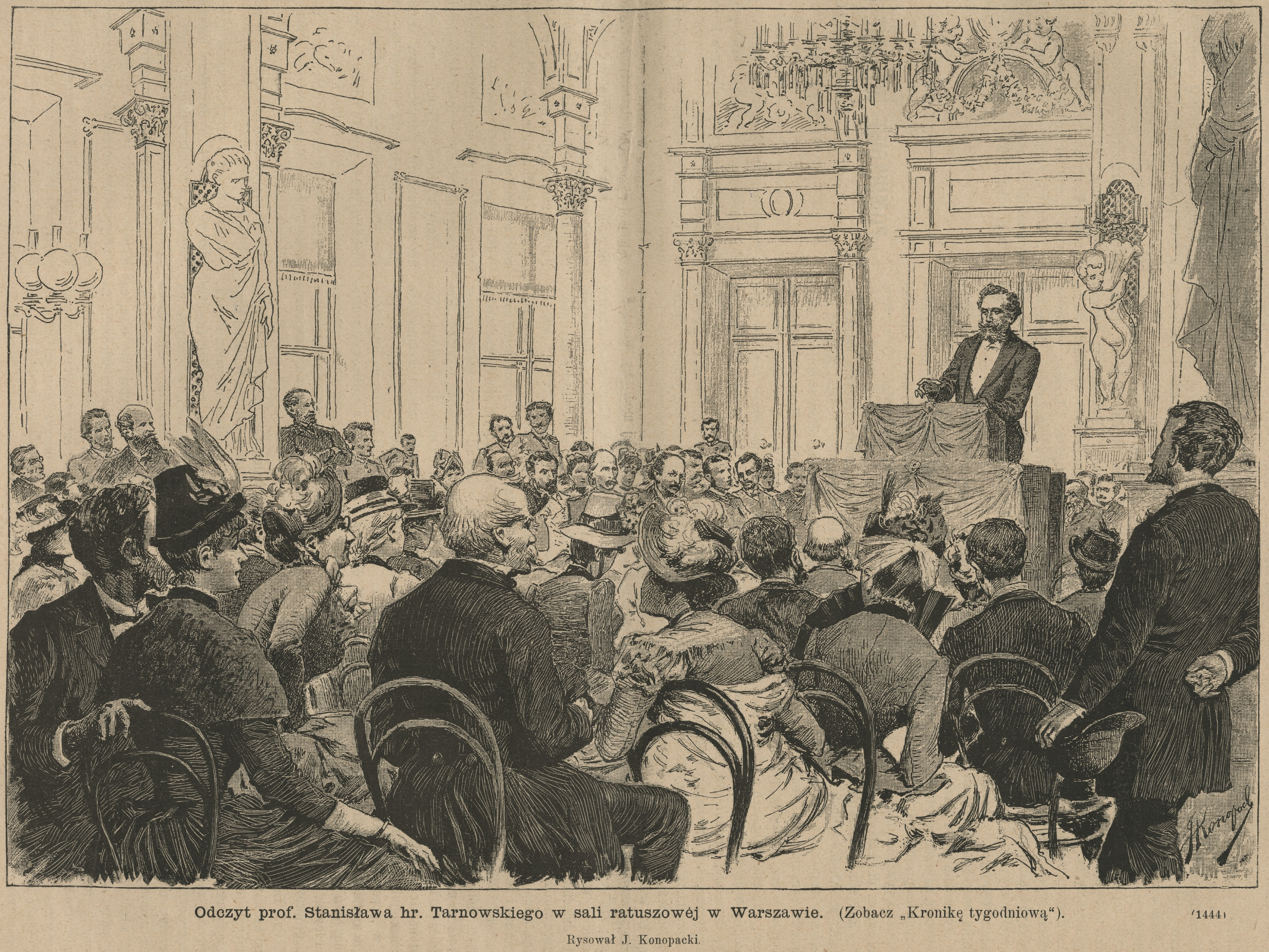
Lecture of Count Stanisław Tarnowski in the Warsaw Town Hall, 1886

Leliwa coat of arms
