= Sam Janus =

Sam Janus may refer to:

- Samuel Janus, American psychotherapist and author
- Samantha Janus, English actress sometimes credited as Sam Janus
