= Sad clown paradox =

Link between comedy and mental disorders

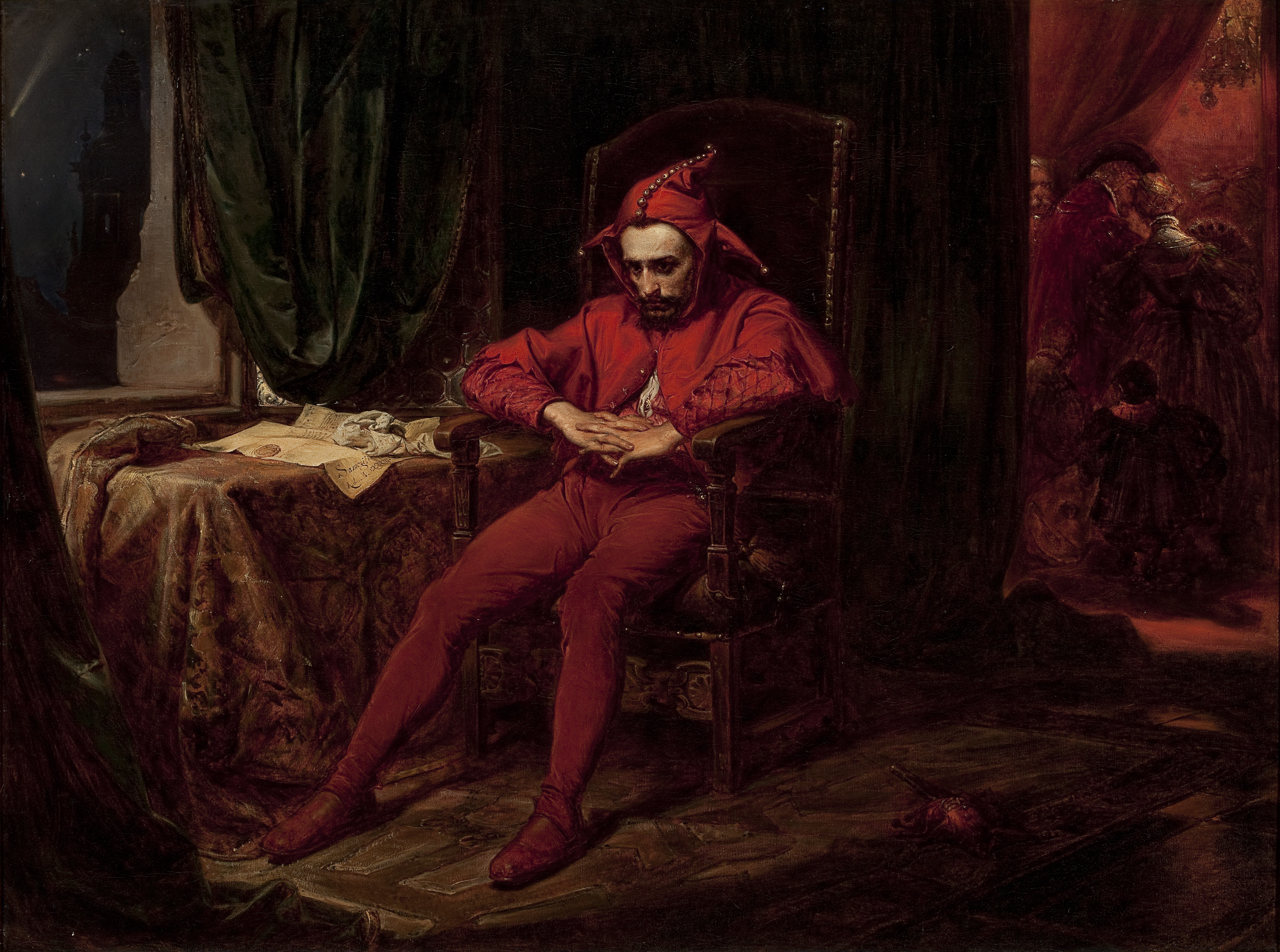
Jan Matejko's 1862 painting Stańczyk, showing a solemn jester isolated from the ball taking place through the doorway behind him

The sad clown paradox is the contradictory association, in performers, between comedy and mental disorders such as depression and anxiety. For those affected, early life is characterised by feelings of deprivation and isolation, where comedy evolves as a release for tension, removing feelings of suppressed physical rage through a verbal outlet.

A series of psychological experiments first published in 1981 by the psychologist Seymour Fisher indicated certain behavioural traits exclusive to comedians and not matched in regular actors. Later work conducted by Kaufman and Kozbelt re-interpreted these results, drawing the understanding that whilst comedy serves as a coping mechanism to hide trauma, it may also motivate a comedian to use humour as a way of forming relations and gaining acceptance.

Humour has been shown to develop from a young age, fostered by parental behaviour. A parent's immature nature can lead to additional responsibilities forced onto children, which can evoke issues of self-worth and a need for acceptance. The constant search for approval may cause mental health issues such as anxiety or depression and when untreated can lead to suicide in extreme situations. Laughter can evolve as a medium for self-preservation, detaching the individual from any adversity faced allowing for perceived control over uncomfortable situations.

Sad clown paradox is characterised by a cyclothymic temperament, which encourages the creation of light-hearted humour in a professional setting, despite inner turmoil. The use of humour as a form of self-medication provides short periods of satisfaction, repeatedly needing to deal with inner turmoil. There is an ever-present anxiety amongst comedians that their popularity may disappear tomorrow and hence they may be driven to exhaustion in their work.

== Influences ==
=== School experiences ===
Comedic performers frequently show humorous tendencies early in life, often identified as the 'class clown' throughout school. Comics recalled mocking the strict nature of school, taking great pleasure in the laughter from their peers. Tommy Smothers commented that during his schooling experiences, "I got a big kick out of them laughing, but I didn’t know what it was that made them laugh, but I knew I could make people laugh." Johnny Carson also emphasised the role of school in a comedian’s life stating that:

I think, by the fact that you find you can get laughs when you are in school—and this is where most of the guys start, when they are growing up in the neighbourhood—they're jerking around, doing silly things, interrupting the class. It's an attention-getting thing, and that, in effect, is saying, 'Hey, look at me, folks, I'm getting your acceptance.'

Due to comedians often being of high intelligence, the school environment was detested and frequently avoided. Comics explained that their teachers lacked understanding and acceptance, identifying their mannerisms as a form of personal exclusion. Woody Allen commented that school "was boring, frightening. The whole thing was ugly. I never had the answers. I never did the homework." Even though a school’s orientation to order and discipline conflicts with the nature of a comic, it can serve as an initial arena for an individual to realise their ability to produce laughter. This discovery creates mixed feelings as frequently the laughter can be directed at themselves with undertones of ridicule or mockery. Regardless of the unpleasantness involved, comics are attracted to the ability of 'making' someone laugh and the power it holds.

The talent for creating humour directs the individual towards a career in the entertainment industry. It was found that comedians did not directly enter the industry as comics; rather, a large proportion began through some form of musical performance. Fisher believed this trend among comedians to have a musical background was derived from their pursuit of creating a more cheerful, welcoming world for the audience.

=== Family relations ===
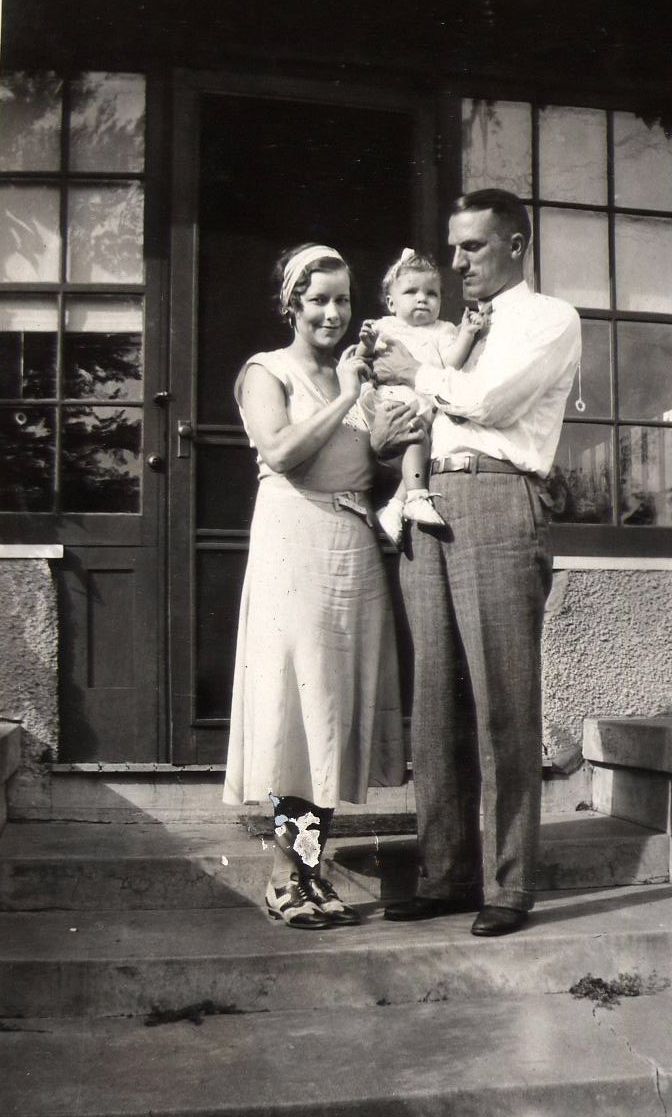
Early experiences with caregivers can shape personal behaviour and feelings of self-worth.

Relationships formed with family members are key in adolescent development, particularly for future satisfaction with life. Studies have shown that comedic performers tend to be raised in distant, somewhat disjointed family settings, characterised by family animosity. Prasinos and Tittler interpreted that this 'family distance' caused individuals to identify as victims of neglect and hence associate as an alienated group. Sad clown paradox can evolve from these incohesive environments from a young age, where a child desires social contact, using humour to obtain intimacy and somewhat relate to others from a distance. Norman Lear commented on his painful childhood due to the constant conflict from his parents stating that; "the only defence against that was to laugh at it, find out what was funny in it."

A study conducted by Fisher found humour-orientated individuals likely to identify their mothers as demanding, unsympathetic and distant. They were seen as avoiding the nurturant role, commonly falling on the father to fulfil this role for the family. An inkblot test for parents of comedians revealed their tendency toward a childlike view of the world, describing protocols with juvenile imagery. Fisher concluded that these views were linked with a parent's reluctance towards responsibilities, associated with a general tone that "happiness prevails.” Parents of comics were found to avoid solemn ideas, identifying negative images in Rorschach tests and then denying their negative elements, such as, "This is a wolf. I thought it was ferocious. But I heard that it is not." This childlike view of the world and rejection of family obligations can cause comedians to embody a greater sense of responsibility and a feeling of obligation to protect others, a compensation for their parents' unconscious rejection of adult responsibilities. This burden of responsibilities has been shown to evoke issues regarding self-worth that foster the development of the sad clown paradox.

It has also been suggested that humour may serve as an attempt to relate to people from a distance, evoked by a childhood desire for social contact. Typically humour is described as an emotional and cognitive state and its absence has been found to cause depression and anxiety.

Comedians have been found to recognize the importance of a competent caregiver, and are often worried about being inadequate parents or caregivers themselves. A study conducted by Samuel Janus revealed that the sampled comedic performers were more prone to wanting larger families. This was associated with a comic's need to provide and form connections that can be fulfilled in a family setting.

== Social context ==
The early lives of comedians are often characterised by suffering, isolation and feelings of deprivation, where humour is used as an outlet or defence against experienced anxiety. German philosopher Nietzsche once described it as; "man alone suffers so excruciatingly in the world that he was compelled to invent laughter." The inability to exhibit direct aggression results in expression through the socially acceptable manner of humour.

Humour provides the ability to assert control and invincibility in a situation. An example is the British comedian Spike Milligan, who frequently experienced manic-depressive states that were onset by severe mental breakdowns. Milligan was capable of creating light-hearted humour and outrageous ideas, despite his manic state. Finding laughter served as motivation to remedy a depressed mental state and effectively function as self-medication. This process has been described as a safeguard against the formation of hopelessness and subsequent depression. Additionally, affiliative and self-enhancing humour can be used to predict symptoms of depression, with higher levels shown to correlate with lower levels of depression.

Recounts from psychiatric treatments revealed some patients to be overwhelmed by negative aspects of their life. However, when these issues were confronted the psychiatrist was met with laughter, followed by the patient dismissing the severity of the issue. The laughter can hide feelings of frustration, disappointment, grief, remorse or even joy in an effort to defend against adversity and allow for self preservation.

== Scientific studies ==
=== Rorschach test ===
The use of inkblot imaging reveals certain characteristics and worries of comedic performers that are not matched in regular actors. Fisher identified four key trends that were common for comedians' Rorschach Tests;

- The identification of 'not-bad' imagery. This involves a traditional, negative idea that has been misunderstood and is a victim to preconceived views. Would include responses such as "Two devils. Funny devils. Not to be taken seriously." or "Pig-like .... Ugly but yet somewhat endearing."
- Comedians tend to associate with concepts of purity versus evil, frequently identifying elements of moral significance in their responses. Fisher concluded that this focus stems from comedians' need to mock rigid societal standards, thereby blurring the strict boundary between good and bad.

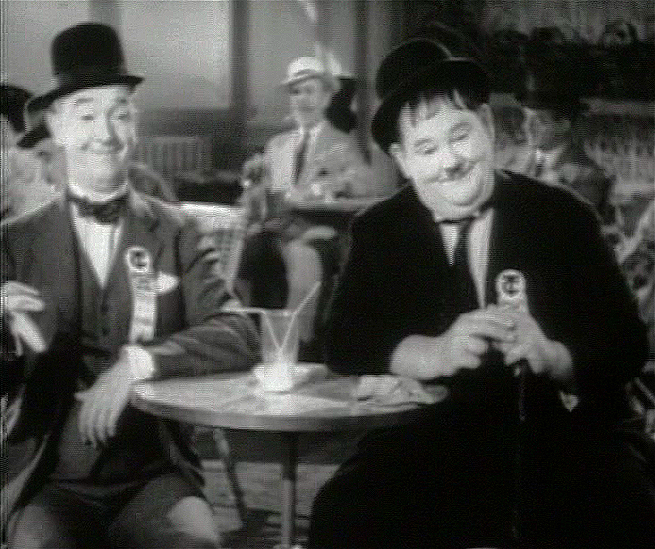
Comedic duo Laurel and Hardy used their different physical sizes as part of their performance

- Importance of scale. Describing objects with reference to their magnitude. This disparity in size serves as a reliable source of humour. Charlie Chaplin utilised an iconic costume of large baggy pants, a small bowler hat, enormous shoes and his small moustache. Comedic duos such as Abbott and Costello or Laurel and Hardy played off their height and weight differences for comedic effect.
- Importance of up versus down, with more concern placed on who or what is down. The use of up-down imagery was frequently implemented by Buster Keaton where his characters were seen falling from great heights or hanging from balconies. A recurring message of failure was linked to the looming threat of falling, negated by a last minute escape and triumph.

Fisher suggested that these traits are directly linked to the comic's perception of self, believing a need to convince others of their value. Comedians were commonly shown to not hold themselves in high regard, providing more self-deprecating remarks than regular actors in a controlled context. These feelings of unworthiness are defended against in the comic's mind by their role in society of helping people and providing laughter. This intent to help people is only momentarily satisfied by audience recognition and approval. This is contrasted against regular actors who were seen to find validation in identifying with figures and concepts larger than themselves.

=== Aptitude/personality tests ===
A study conducted by Janus found comedians worked to exhaustion to ensure they remained relevant and funny. He found that from his sample of comedic performers, eighty percent have been involved in psychotherapy and feared its effect on their ability for humour. Comedians were shown to be critical towards the motives of others and feared the longevity of their popularity as celebrities. Most participants from Janus’ study revealed an inescapable sense of depression which they faced alongside their work. The manner in which comedy momentarily alleviates their depression and anxiety allows them to function. However, comedians function for short periods of time, constantly requiring admiration and acknowledgement for their work.

Comedians have also been shown to display high levels of psychotic personality traits, scoring high in introvertive anhedonia and impulsive non-conformity. The instability between depressive traits and more extroverted, manic states is traditionally described as cyclothymic temperament. British comedian Stephen Fry confessed to the common mental state he experiences when performing; "there are times when I'm doing QI and I'm going 'ha ha, yeah, yeah', and inside I'm going 'I want to fucking die. I... want... to... fucking... die.'" Fry's comments indicate the idea of manic defence, where opposite emotions are used to distract and cope with uncomfortable feelings.

== Pagliacci joke ==
Giovanni Martinelli, tenor of the N.Y. Metropolitan Opera Company in Vesti la giubba from the opera I Pagliacci by Leoncavallo. The clown has learned about his wife's infidelity and bitterly encourages himself to laugh as the show must go on.

An ironical story dating from 1784 or earlier exemplifies the sad clown paradox. The parable, anecdote, or joke involves a doctor advising a patient to treat his depression by seeing a great clown who is performing in the locality, but it turns out that the patient is actually the clown out of costume. The story has been ascribed to historical clowns and occurred in works of fiction; in 21st-century English-language retellings, the clown's name is often Pagliacci. (Note: Pagliacci is the Italian word for clowns, and was popularised as a name for the joke's character by Alan Moore's Watchmen. It is the name of an 1892 opera, which includes a play-within-the-play with a character named Pagliaccio ("Clown"). Pagliacci as the name of a sad clown also occurs in the 1965 song "The Tracks of My Tears": "So just like Pagliacci did / I'm gonna keep my sadness hid".)

In early versions, the clown is Carlin (Carlo Bertinazzi, 1710–1783) of the Comédie-Italienne in Paris, as in Johann Georg Ritter von Zimmermann's 1784 German work On Solitude. The name is rendered Carlini in the 1800 English translation of Zimmermann, quoted in William Perfect's Annals of Insanity. An 1827 French "translation" of Italian correspondence between Carlin and Pope Clement XIV (which not all readers understood was a work of fiction by its "editor", Henri de Latouche) includes a version of the story told in 1769 by Carlin himself, visiting a Parisian quack named Bériot. Ralph Waldo Emerson's 1875 essay, "The Comic", ends with a version of the story with a comic named Carlini in Naples.

By 1858 the anecdote was attached to English actor Joseph Grimaldi (1778–1837) "the Garrick of clowns". As such it was retold by Charlie Chaplin and Stephen Leacock. The 1885 Mexican poem Reír Llorando ("Laughing While Crying") by Juan de Dios Peza, which tells the story of an English actor named "Garrik", (Note: "Garrick" in many modern printings) is widely known in Latin America.

In 1881 Arsène Houssaye told the story of Jean-Gaspard Deburau in 1840 visiting doctor Philippe Ricord. Other clowns of whom the story has been told include Dominique fils (Pierre-François Biancolelli, 1680–1734), Joseph Munden (1759–1832), George L. Fox (1825–1877), Little Tich (1867–1928), and Grock (Charles Adrien Wettach, 1880–1959).

The 1943–45 film Children of Paradise, with Deburau as main character, mentions the story. In the 1928 film Laugh, Clown, Laugh, it happens to Lon Chaney's character Flik.

In Alan Moore's 1986–87 graphic novel Watchmen, the character Rorschach contemplates the death of fellow-crimefighter The Comedian with an internal monologue:

Heard joke once: Man goes to doctor. Says he's depressed. Says life seems harsh and cruel. Says he feels all alone in a threatening world where what lies ahead is vague and uncertain. Doctor says, 'Treatment is simple. Great clown Pagliacci is in town tonight. Go and see him. That should pick you up.' Man bursts into tears. Says, 'But doctor…I am Pagliacci.' Good joke. Everybody laugh. Roll on snare drum. Curtains.

Moore's phrasing of the joke became an internet meme in the early 2010s, using the name Pagliacci but giving alternate punchlines such as "But doctor, I don't think you understand depression." The original Pagliacci punchline was widely repeated on social media in 2014 following the suicide of comedian Robin Williams.

== See also ==
- Creativity and mental illness
- Wise fool
- Mera Naam Joker, a 1970 Indian film about a sad clown

== Sources ==
- Ando, Victoria; Claridge, Gordon; Clark, Ken (2018-05-15), "Psychotic traits in comedians", Psychopathology and Personality Dimensions, vol. 204, Routledge, pp. 205–213, doi:10.4324/9781315268217-16, ISBN 9781315268217, PMID 24434072
- Angell, Jimmye Dell (1971), The effects of social success and social failure on the humor production of wits, University of Nevada, OCLC 3276478
- Borowitz, Helen O. (1984). "Painted Smiles: Sad Clowns in French Art and Literature". The Bulletin of the Cleveland Museum of Art. 71 (1): 23–35. ISSN 0009-8841. JSTOR 25159845.
- Brody, Morris (1950), "The Meaning of Laughter", The Psychoanalytic Quarterly, 19 (2): 192–201, doi:10.1080/21674086.1950.11925797, PMID 15424308
- Chapman, Antony J.; Foot, Hugh C., eds. (2017-07-05). Humor and laughter : theory, research, and applications. Routledge. pp. 245–258. ISBN 9781351514217. OCLC 994145305.
- Creed, Michael; Whitley, Rob (2016-09-06), "Assessing Fidelity to Suicide Reporting Guidelines in Canadian News Media: The Death of Robin Williams", The Canadian Journal of Psychiatry, 62 (5): 313–317, doi:10.1177/0706743715621255, ISSN 0706-7437, PMC 5459225, PMID 27600531
- Fisher, Rhoda L. (1980), Schlemiel children, PT Partners L.P, OCLC 926645893
- Fisher, Seymour (1981), Pretend the World Is Funny and Forever : a Psychological Analysis of Comedians, Clowns, and Actors, Lawrence Erlbaum Associates, Inc., p. 2, ISBN 9781317770053, OCLC 868490423
- Hugelshofer, Daniela S.; Kwon, Paul; Reff, Robert C.; Olson, Megan L. (2006). "Humour's role in the relation between attributional style and dysphoria". European Journal of Personality. 20 (4): 325–336. doi:10.1002/per.586. ISSN 0890-2070. S2CID 145264762.
- Janus, Samuel S. (1975), "The great comedians: Personality and other factors", The American Journal of Psychoanalysis, 35 (2): 169–174, doi:10.1007/bf01358189, ISSN 0002-9548, PMID 1190350, S2CID 20762581
- Janus, Samuel S.; Bess, Barbara E.; Janus, Beth R. (1978), "The great comediennes: Personality and other factors", The American Journal of Psychoanalysis, 38 (4): 367–372, doi:10.1007/bf01253595, ISSN 0002-9548, PMID 736178, S2CID 33561259
- Kaufman, Scott Barry; Kozbelt, Aaron (2009), "The Tears of a Clown: Understanding Comedy Writers", The Psychology of Creative Writing, Cambridge University Press, p. 94, doi:10.1017/cbo9780511627101.007, ISBN 9780511627101, S2CID 1280968
- Keith-Spiegel, Patricia (1972), "Early Conceptions of Humor: Varieties and Issues", The Psychology of Humor, Elsevier, pp. 3–39, doi:10.1016/b978-0-12-288950-9.50007-9, ISBN 9780122889509
- Leung, Jin -Pang; Leung, Kwok (1992), "Life satisfaction, self-concept, and relationship with parents in adolescence", Journal of Youth and Adolescence, 21 (6): 653–665, doi:10.1007/bf01538737, ISSN 0047-2891, PMID 24264168, S2CID 21063708
- Martin, Rod A.; Puhlik-Doris, Patricia; Larsen, Gwen; Gray, Jeanette; Weir, Kelly (2003), "Individual differences in uses of humor and their relation to psychological well-being: Development of the Humor Styles Questionnaire", Journal of Research in Personality, 37 (1): 48–75, doi:10.1016/s0092-6566(02)00534-2, ISSN 0092-6566, S2CID 143841188
- Prasinos, Steven; Tittler, Bennett I. (1981), "The family relationships of humor-oriented adolescents1", Journal of Personality, 49 (3): 295–304, doi:10.1111/j.1467-6494.1981.tb00938.x, ISSN 0022-3506
