= Valerian Kalinka =

Polish priest and historian

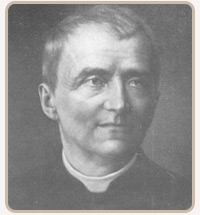
Valerian Kalinka in 1870

Valerian Kalinka (or Walerian Kalinka; 20 November 1826 – 16 December 1886) was a Polish priest and historian.

== Biography ==
Kalinka was born in Kraków, but fled from Poland in 1846 on account of political entanglements and his involvement in the Krakow Uprising. Kalinka was the founder of the Polish branch of the Resurrectionist Order. He worked on the "Czas" newspaper in 1848, but finally took refuge in Paris, where his first work was written -- Galicia und Cracoio, an historical and social picture of the country from 1772 to 1850. He afterwards thought of writing a history of Polish emigration, but eventually chose to edit a weekly periodical entitled "Political Polish News", the principal contributors to which were himself and Julian Klaczko. Though forbidden everywhere but in Posen, it existed for four years, and dealt with every aspect of Polish national life. Kalinka's articles show an acquaintance with law, administration, history, and statistics, and had mostly to do with the inner life of Poland. He became an activist in the Hôtel Lambert group.

After 1863, when searching for documents for a life of Prince Adam Czartoryski, he stumbled on important papers which he published in two volumes as The Last Years of Stanislaus Augustus (1787–95). This work placed him at once in the first rank of Polish writers. Poland had not yet had such an historian, especially in the province of diplomacy and foreign politics. Józef Szujski, though unknown to Kalinka, was at the same time working in the same direction. Both were accused of undermining patriotic self-respect, of lowering Poland in foreign eyes, and of destroying veneration for the past. In the preface to this work, Kalinka had already answered these charges. A Pole, he said, is not less a Pole when he learns from past errors how to serve his country better.

About this time Kalinka entered the novitiate of the Resurrection Fathers in Rome, where, save for a few visits to Galicia, he subsequently resided until in 1877, after a visit to the Catholic missions in Bulgaria, he became chaplain of a convent in Jarosław. Here in 1880 appeared the first volume of his Sejmczteroletni (The Four Years Diet). To the criticism it received, Kalinka replied: "History calls first for truth; nor can truth harm patriotism." The second volume, appeared in 1886, the end of the thirty years he spent writing. He died in Jarosław.

== Works ==
- Galicja i Kraków pod panowaniem austriackim, 1853
- Przegrana Francji i przyszłość Europy
- Hugo Kołłątaj
- Nasze zadania i uchybienia
- Ostatnie lata panowania Stanisława Augusta
- O Dziejach Polski prof. M.Bobrzyńskiego
- O znaczeniu obchodu 3 Maja
- Przegrana Francji i przyszłość Europy
- Względy Polskie w sprawie władzy świeckiej papieża
- Żale Polaków na Zachód
