= Prussian Homage (painting) =

Oil on canvas painting by Jan Matejko

Coordinates: 50°03′36″N 19°55′26″E

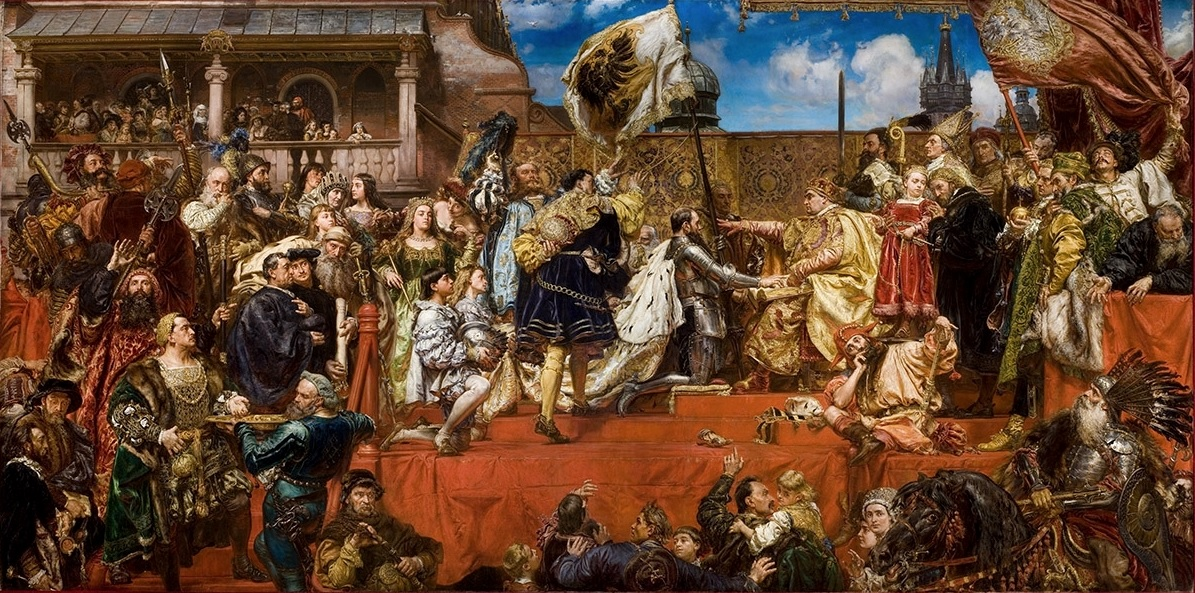
- Artist: Jan Matejko
- Year: 1879–1882
- Medium: Oil on canvas
- Dimensions: 388 cm × 785 cm (152.75 in × 309.05 in)
- Location: Sukiennice Museum, Kraków
- Owner: Kraków National Museum

The Prussian Homage (Polish: Hołd pruski) is an oil on canvas painting by Polish painter Jan Matejko painted between 1879 and 1882 in Kraków (then part of Austria-Hungary). The painting depicts the "Prussian Homage", a significant political event from the time of the Renaissance in Poland in which Albrecht of Hohenzollern, the Duke of Prussia paid tribute and swore allegiance to King Sigismund I the Old in Kraków's market square on 10 April 1525. Matejko depicted over thirty important figures of the Polish Renaissance period, taking the liberty of including several who were not actually present at the event.

The painting glorifies this event in Poland's past and its culture, and the majesty of its kings. At the same time, the painting has darker undertones, reflecting the troubled times that befell Poland in the late eighteenth century, for the Kingdom of Prussia would become one of the partitioning powers that ended the independence of Poland. The painting was seen by some as anti-Prussian, foretelling its perceived betrayal of Poland; others have noted it is also critical of Poland, as Matejko included signs that signify this seemingly triumphant moment was a hollow, wasted victory. Matejko created his painting to remind others about the history of the no-longer-independent country he loved, and about the changing fates of history. The painting is counted among his masterpieces.

== History ==
Matejko began to paint the Prussian Homage on Christmas Eve 1879 and finished it in 1882. He donated it to the Polish nation (Note: Technically, the painting was donated to the city of Kraków.) during the meeting of the Diet of Galicia (Sejm Krajowy) in Lwów (Lviv) on 7 October 1882 to start a collection designed to revive the remodelling of Wawel Castle. It was subsequently exhibited in Kraków, Lwów and Warsaw, as well as in Berlin, Paris, Budapest, and most notably in Rome and Vienna. When it returned to Kraków in 1885, it was temporarily exhibited in the Sukiennice Museum because the Royal Wawel Castle was occupied at that time by the Austrian army, as Kraków was part of the Austrian partition of Poland.

Because of the pro-Polish and anti-Prussian character of the painting German emperor William I objected to a proposal to reward Matejko. During this period, Prussia was trying to suppress Polish culture in its territory and Germanise it. During World War II, the Nazis systematically tried to destroy all Polish cultural artefacts in occupied Poland. This painting, together with Matejko's painting of the Battle of Grunwald, was on their "most wanted" list. Fortunately it was hidden and safeguarded throughout the war in the town of Zamość.

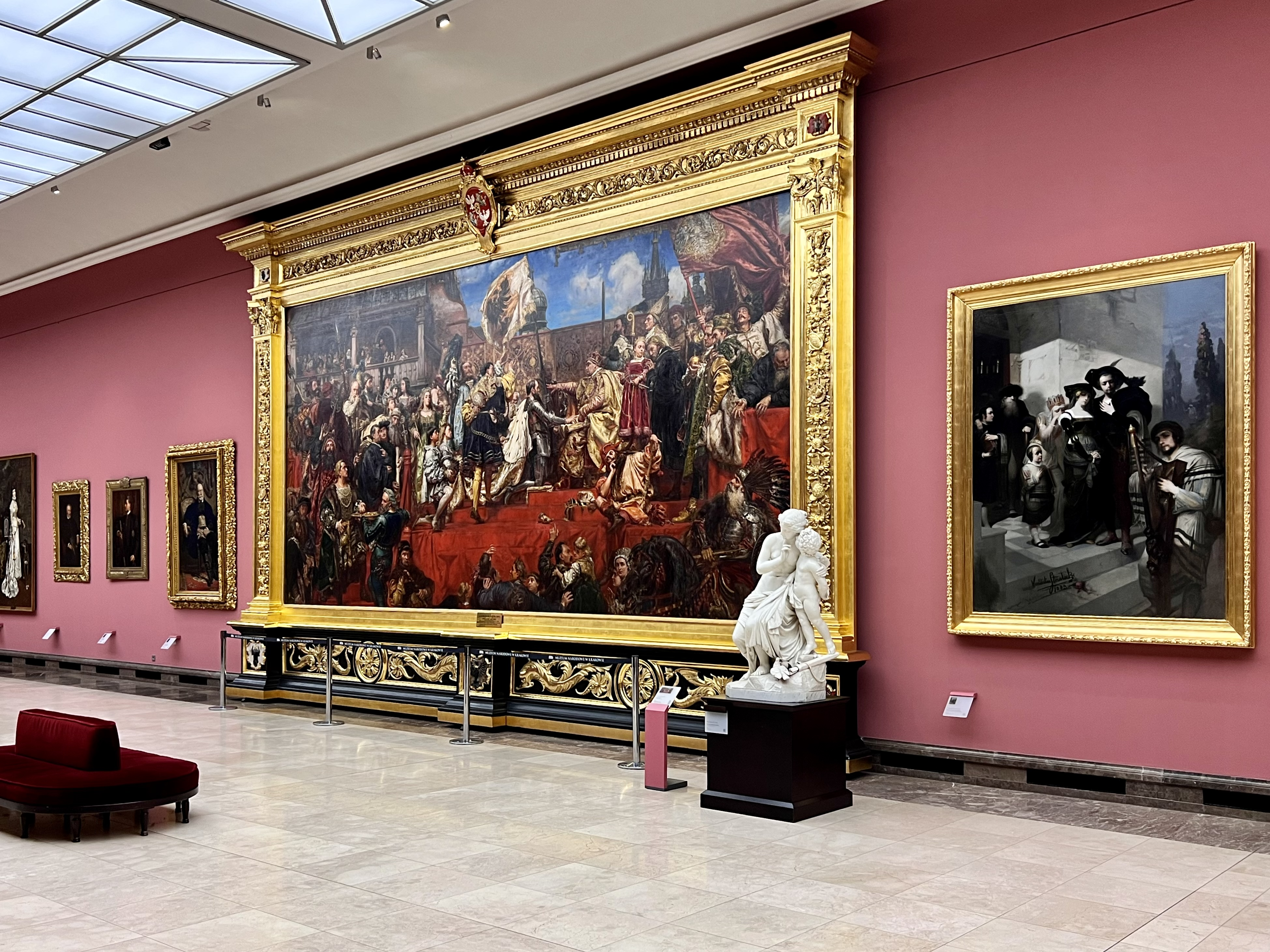
The Prussian Homage on display at the Sukiennice Museum in Kraków

For most of the twentieth and at the beginning of the twentieth-first centuries, the painting has been hung in the National Museum gallery in the Sukiennice Museum in Kraków, where it is usually displayed in the Prussian Homage Hall.

Renovation work started in the Sukiennice Museum in June 2008. The painting previously had been restored in 1915 and 1938. During World War II it was damaged while it was at Zamość, and in 1945 it was renovated. In 1974, experts again tried to restore it to its original condition before it went on public exhibition in Moscow. The most recent restoration process took place between 2006 and 2008, when the painting was finally returned to its former glory.

In 2011, the painting was sent to Germany for an art exhibition entitled "Side by Side Poland – Germany", which was promoted as part of the 1000 Years of Art and History project of Royal Warsaw Castle in cooperation with the Martin-Gropius-Bau exhibition hall in Berlin. It was on display there between 23 September 2011 and 9 January 2012.

== Significance ==
This painting is considered among Matejko's most famous works and is also one of his largest canvases. It portrays an event of significant political triumph for Poland, the Prussian Homage, in which Poland was able to enforce its will over Prussia. Prussia later gained independence and turned against the Polish–Lithuanian Commonwealth, becoming one of the nations that divided Poland among them. Matejko's painting was created during the partition period, when independent Poland had ceased to exist, and like many of Matejko's other works, it aimed to remind the Polish people of their most famous historical triumphs.

At the same time, the painting foreshadows the tragedies of the future through the gestures and facial expressions of certain characters. This is visible, for example, in the figures of King Sigismund I the Old and Albrecht Hohenzollern, who is kneeling before him. Sigismund is portrayed as a powerful and majestic figure but not threatening. He treats Albrecht lightly—signifying that this event was only a temporary victory and not a total, lasting domination that crushed his opponent. Albrecht's character is portrayed with many signs of his villainous intent. He kneels on both knees, which a duke should do only in front of a God, not a sovereign. This implies that he does not see Sigismund as a sovereign. He grips his standard strongly, but touches the Bible only lightly. The standard flies on a military lance, implying that Prussia had further military ambitions. Finally, there is a gauntlet on the ground, an implied challenge to Sigismund from Albrecht.

Due to its criticism of Albrecht and the event it portrayed, the painting often is seen as strongly anti-Prussian. While it appears to glorify Poland, it is also critical of the country. Matejko went beyond portraying the glory of a historical event and attempted to convey hints of how the country's history would play out in the future. This event was merely a hollow victory that failed to secure Poland's future. Matejko shows that the homage was an empty gesture and that it was Prussia that exploited it rather than Poland. Nobody in the painting is smiling except a lady of the court who is engaged in idle gossip.

The painting has been the subject of numerous art historical studies and has been reinterpreted through the works of artists such as Tadeusz Kantor. In 1992, the Piwnica pod Baranami cabaret group organized a historical re-enactment of the painting.

== Historical characters in the painting ==
Matejko depicted many important figures of the Polish Renaissance period including taking the liberty to include at least one who were not actually present at the event. In a similar vein, although the event portrayed took place in 1525, Matejko painted fragments of the Sukiennice in Renaissance style, a form that dates from the year 1555, after a fire which destroyed the building in its original Gothic style. St. Mary's Basilica is visible in the background.

At the center of the painting, Albrecht, Duke of Prussia is kneeling before his maternal uncle King Sigismund I the Old of Poland. Sigismund Augustus is shown here as a 5-year-old boy wearing a red dress, held up by Piotr Opaliński, the court house tutor. Matejko portrayed Józef Szujski, professor of the Jagiellonian University, as Opaliński. Thirty one other political figures contemporary with the event are also depicted, including:

- Behind Albrecht (Albert), Duke of Prussia, are two other German rulers, his brother George, Margrave of Brandenburg-Ansbach with his hat in his right hand and their brother-in-law Frederick II of Legnica, whose face is only partially visible, who both joined Albrecht in the homage.
- In the space between Frederick and Albrecht, was Castellan Łukasz II Górka (the old, bearded man), who was a sympathizer with Prussia.
- Albrecht's advisor, Commander Friedrich von Heydeck is behind the standard, waiting to receive it after the scene is over.
- The Bishop of Kraków, Piotr Tomicki (wearing a bishop's mitre) stands to the right of the King Sigismund.
- The man holding up a sword is Hieronymus Jaroslaw Łaski, a diplomat and nephew of Archbishop Jan Łaski (1456–1531). Both men are shown to the right of the king, at the top of the crowd. Jan is separated from Hieronymous by Bishop Tomicki. Hieronymous is holding the sword with which Albrecht will be knighted stiffly as a warning to the Prussian ruler.
- Duchess Anna Radziwiłł, ruler of Masovia, appears top left. Historically, the Duchess died in 1522 before the event occurred. However, Matejko included her in the painting to emphasize the connection between Masovia and Poland.
- Janusz III of Masovia, the last Duke of Masovia of the Piast line. He died at a very young age in 1526.
- Hedwig Jagiellon, Electress of Brandenburg, who was daughter of Sigismund I the Old and his first wife Barbara Zápolya, and through him a cousin of Albrecht. Her parents planned her marriage to Prince Janusz. The death of the Duke ruined her plans. The character was modeled by Matejko's daughter Beata. She is seen just below Anna Radziwiłł at the top left of the painting.
- Mauritius Ferber, Bishop of Warmia, and Krzysztof Kreutzer, Prussian diplomat, are engaged in discussion just below and to the left of Hedwig. Ferber appears worried and makes a well-hidden gesture to repel evil; Kreutzer tries to calm him.
- Queen Bona Sforza appears center-left. Matejko used his wife Teodora as a model for the Queen.
- Piotr Kmita Sobieński, Grand Marshal of the Crown and governor of Kraków, appears with his right hand raised purportedly a gesture to demand silence and order from the crowd.
- Przecław Lanckoroński, starost of Khmilnyk, appears on horseback in the lower right of the painting. He is a notable military commander and his figure personifies the still-respectable military prowess of the Commonwealth. (Note: Yet past his youth.)
- The old mustached man in white above Bishop Ferber and to the left of Duchess Anna is Prince Konstanty Ostrogski, Grand Lithuanian Hetman (military leader), Voivode of Trakai, and Castellan of Vilnius.
- Located to the right of Prince Ostrogski and wearing a helmet is Jan Amor Tarnowski, the governor of Kraków who would later achieve high military office. This portrait was based on Stanisław Tarnowski, a professor of the Jagiellonian University and literary historian who would publish Matejko's biography four years after his death.
- The man taking coins from the tray is Andrzej Kościelecki, treasurer and Court Marshal, who skillfully managed the state finances. Looking proudly, unworried, seeing only victory, he symbolizes the importance and wealth of Polish officials of the period.
- To the right of the large black figure of Opaliński is Krzysztof Szydłowiecki who was one of King Sigismund's chief advisors in matters of foreign affairs. Holding the globus cruciger, he was one of the main political figures in contemporary Polish and Prussian politics and his worried visage questions the honesty of the ceremony.
- Hetman Mikołaj Firlej, Castellan of Kraków, is located between Krzysztof Szydłowiecki and Andrzej Tęczyński. One of many characters with a worried expression, Firlej, a respected military leader, is likely considering the possibility of Prussia growing into a military power.
- Andrzej Tęczyński, Ensign of Kraków, who later became Castellan of Kraków, appears holding the banner in the top right corner. He is having difficulty holding the Polish flag unfolded, which once again foreshadows the troubles ahead.
- Albertas Goštautas, Grand Chancellor of Lithuania and voivode of Vilnius, is barely visible in the top right of the painting. (Note: The king entrusted him with the supervision of the drafting of the Statute of Lithuania.) His presence in the painting is intended to symbolize the wisdom of the king as a legislator.
- Below the king sits Stańczyk. His worried face shows doubt that the homage will mean victory in the long run, and he is making a gesture to repel bad luck.
- In the lower-left corner of the painting holding a document bearing the royal seal, stands Bartolommeo Berrecci, architect who rebuilt Royal Wawel Castle. Next to him is Seweryn Boner, an important burgher and banker. His face is one of the two self-portraits of Jan Matejko. The second is the face of the royal jester Stańczyk. As Berrecci, Matejko portrayed himself as a gray eminence, dominating the scene, with a royal scepter in his hand.

=== Generic characters of some significance ===
Some generic characters of minor importance were also depicted by Matejko in the painting. The following personages are:

- An old Teutonic soldier is shown under Hedwig; he signifies the end of the Teutonic Order.
- Underneath the soldier at the bottom of the painting, an executor or a city guard keeps watch on the crowd, ensuring no unrest will disrupt the proceedings.
- At the top of the painting, a dove symbolizing peace can be seen.
