= Wonderful Fool =

Novel by Shusaku Endō

Wonderful Fool: a novel
- First UK edition (1974)
- Author: Shusaku Endo
- Original title: おバカさん / (Obaka-san)
- Translator: Francis Mathy
- Language: Japanese
- Published: 1959
- Publication place: Japan
- English publication date: 1974 Peter Owen (UK); 1983 Harper & Row (US)
- Media type: Book
- ISBN: 9780068598534
- OCLC: 10161740

Wonderful Fool (おバカさん, Obaka-san) is a novel by the Japanese author Shusaku Endō, originally serialized in the newspaper Asahi Shimbun in 1959. The main character, Gaston Bonaparte (a relative to the famous Napoleon Bonaparte), arrives at the Yokohama seaport to visit an old pen friend of his living in Tokyo. Gaston is a wise fool, an incredibly kind, innocent and naïve, which causes different people to like him, help him, or take advantage of him. He never loses faith in humanity, however, and manages to make a deep impression on the most hardhearted persons. Beneath the light humor of the story are many clear references both to Endo's life story and his Christian beliefs.

== Plot summary ==
One day Takamori, a young man living with his mother and dominant younger sister Tomoe, receives a letter from Singapore. After a while they manage to decipher the unusually poor Japanese, and figure out that Gaston Bonaparte, a man who used to be a pen friend of Takamori during his school days, will soon arrive in Japan. On the expected day, they find the poorly dressed Gaston (a striking contrast to his more famous relative, in the eyes of his Japanese hosts) in the cheapest class, deep down in the ship.

Gaston immediately befriends a stray dog (who he initially calls 犬さん - Mr. Dog, but later renames Napoleon), who is to follow him for most of the story but he is eventually captured by the dog catcher and killed. After staying a few days at Takamori and Tomoe's home, Gaston decides to carry on his mysterious mission in Japan. He ends up checking into a love hotel in Shibuya with his dog, attracting some strange looks from the owner. During the night Gaston manages to help a thieving prostitute escape (although mostly due to misunderstanding the situation), which gets him kicked out of the hotel in the middle of the night, but she gets him food and puts him in contact with an old fortune teller, who makes Gaston his assistant. Soon Gaston is kidnapped by a gangster planning to murder two old army officers for revenge. Gaston tries to talk the man, Endo, out of his violent plans. When this doesn't work, he simply steals the bullets from Endo's gun, thus making the victim able to run away.

Endo knocks Gaston out and flees, but Gaston manages to track the next victim down, and outside his house he finds Endo once again. The former is not overly happy to see him, but figures that he could use some help with digging up some silver that the army officer stole during the war. In the mountain swamp where the treasure is supposed to be located, Endo and the army officer get into a fight. Gaston gets between them, saving the life of Endo, who is later found by a fisherman and rushed to a hospital.

Gaston disappears and is never found again. Takamori and Tomoe later get hold of Gaston's diary. All that is written is a scrawl about his failure in passing the missionary exam. It is written that he still must go to Japan. It is clear by the novel's end that Gaston's visit has led the main characters to reassess their lives, Takamori begins to look at the less well off in Tokyo for the first time.
