= Stańczyk (painting) =

Painting by Jan Matejko

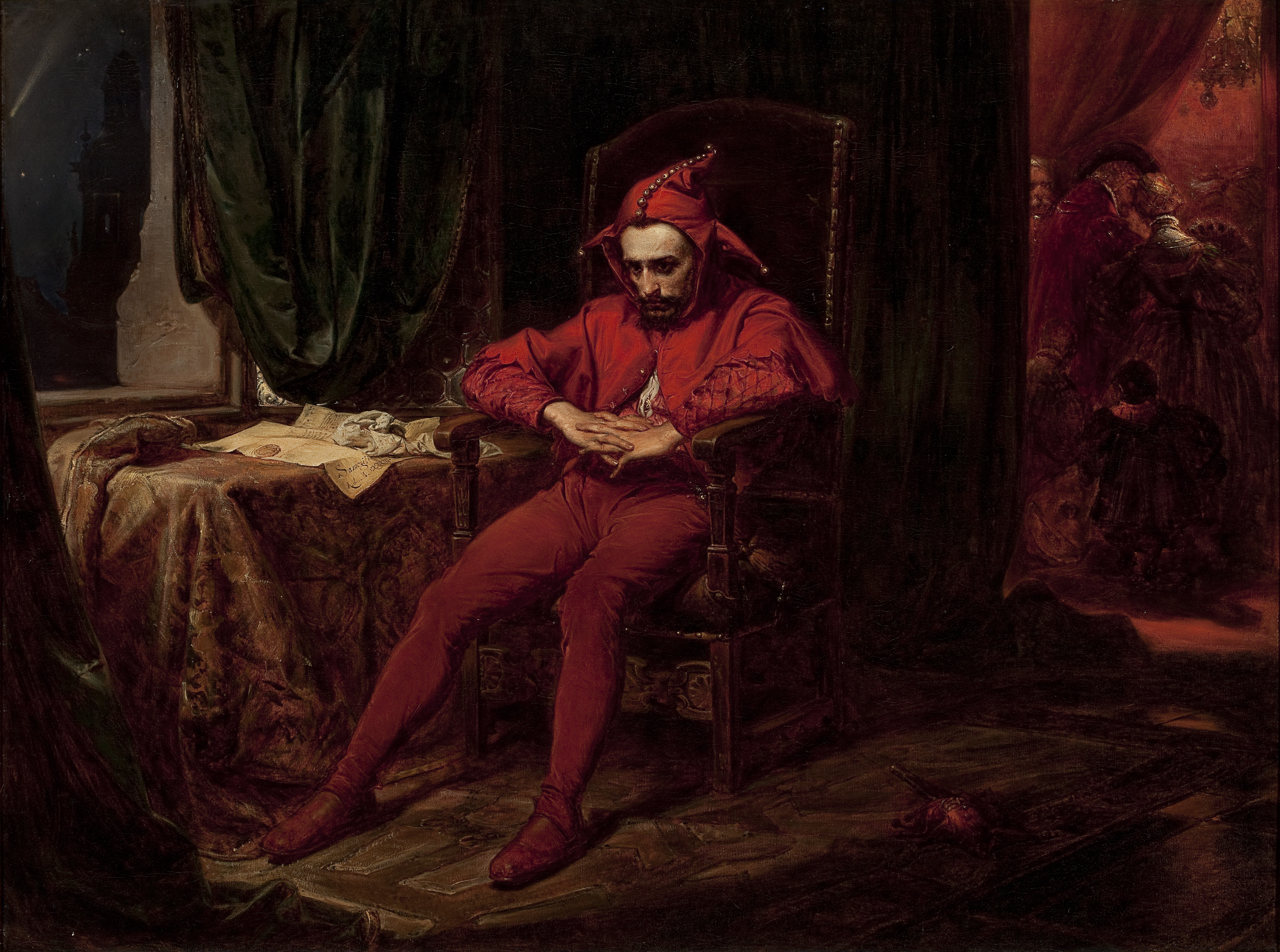
- Artist: Jan Matejko
- Year: 1862
- Medium: Oil on canvas
- Dimensions: 120 cm × 88 cm (47 in × 35 in)
- Location: National Museum, Warsaw

Stańczyk (Full title: Stańczyk during a ball at the court of Queen Bona in the face of the loss of Smolensk, Polish: Stańczyk w czasie balu na dworze królowej Bony wobec straconego Smoleńska) is a painting by Jan Matejko finished in 1862. This painting was acquired by the National Museum in Warsaw in 1924. During World War II it was looted by the Nazis, but later seized by the Soviet Union and returned to Poland around 1956.

Stańczyk has been described by the Warsaw National Museum as one of the most recognizable paintings in its collection, and is a flagship painting for the "Collection of Polish paintings prior to 1914". Its primary component is the contrast between the solemn Stańczyk, a historical Polish court jester and the painting's namesake, and the lively ball in the background. The painting presents Stańczyk with a sense of isolation and hopelessness, which reflects the political situation of Poland during the 19th century.

Stańczyk remains an important symbol of Polish culture. Stańczyk embodied satire to criticize social problems while also offering wisdom to the common people. His character is remembered and is a proud part of Polish national character. The painting has created an image of Stańczyk that has become iconic and widely recognized in Poland.

== Stańczyk ==
Stańczyk, the main figure depicted in the painting, was the court jester when Poland was at the height of its political, economic and cultural power during the era of the Renaissance in Poland, during the reign of King Sigismund I the Old (reigned 1506–1548). He was a popular figure; besides his fame as a jester he has been described as an eloquent, witty, and intelligent man, using satire to comment on the nation's past, present, and future. Unlike jesters of other European courts, Stańczyk has always been considered as much more than a mere entertainer. Stańczyk's fame and legend were strong in his own time and enjoyed a resurgence in the 19th century, and he remains well known to this day.

Scarcity of sources gave rise to four distinct hypotheses about Stańczyk in the 19th century: that he was entirely invented by Jan Kochanowski and his colleagues, that he was "perhaps a typical jester dressed by his contemporaries in an Aesopian attire, perhaps a Shakespearean vision of 19th-century writers, or perhaps indeed a grey eminence of the societatis ioculatorum [jesters' society]". Consensus among modern scholars is that such a person did exist and the figure had a tremendous importance to Polish culture of later centuries regardless, appearing in works of many artists of the 19th and 20th centuries. Among others, he is depicted in a work by Julian Ursyn Niemcewicz (in Jan z Tęczna. Powieść historyczna, 1825) and several works by Józef Ignacy Kraszewski (1839, 1841).

== Content ==
The full title of the painting is Stańczyk w czasie balu na dworze królowej Bony wobec straconego Smoleńska (Stańczyk during a ball at the court of Queen Bona in the face of the loss of Smolensk). The title erroneously suggests that Poland was at the time ruled by Queen Bona Sforza, when in fact, on 30 July 1514, when Smolensk was lost to Russia, Poland was ruled by King Sigismund the Old and his first wife, Queen Barbara Zápolya. Zápolya was the queen of Poland from 1512 to 1515; Bona Sforza married Sigismund only in 1518. Smolensk was captured in 1514, during the second Muscovite–Lithuanian War.

The primary composition of the painting is in the contrast between the solemn jester (Stańczyk) – the focus of the painting – and the lively ball going on in the background. Stańczyk is shown sitting alone in a dark room, while a ball, hosted by the royal family, is in full swing in the neighbouring hall. His appearance is unlike that one would expect in a jester – gloomy, deep in thought. His seriousness is reinforced by his accessories: his marotte lies discarded on the floor, whereas a holy medallion of the Black Madonna of Częstochowa can be seen on his torso. The wrinkled carpet at Stańczyk's feet could have been formed by his collapsing heavily into the chair upon reading the letter, or through a nervous shifting of the feet thereafter. On the table lies a letter likely announcing that the Grand Duchy of Lithuania has lost Smolensk (now in Russia) to the Grand Duchy of Moscow, causing Stańczyk's sorrow and reflection on his fatherland's fate. The letter seems to have been discarded by some official, and only the jester realizes its significance – while the rulers are partying, celebrating the recent victory at the Battle of Orsha, disregarding the bad news about Smolensk. The letter bears the year 1533 (A.d. MDXXXIII) and the name "Samogitia", a province of the Commonwealth. The note is incongruent with the actual date of the fall of Smolensk in 1514, and is a matter of ongoing debate, though an outright mistake by the meticulous Matejko, known for use of symbolism and iconography, is unlikely. Another symbol, a lute, symbol of glory, is being carried by a court dwarf, stereotyped as a person of low stature and morale in Matejko's time; this suggests a decline of the Jagiellonian dynasty's fortunes. The window is thrown – or was blown – open, ruffling the tablecloth and alluding to an upset of the present order. Through the open window, the darkened profile of Wawel Cathedral in Krakow is visible – the site of the coronation of Polish kings. Next to it, a comet is seen – a portent of ill-fortune. The imagery of downfall is completed with the inclusion of the three stars of Orion's Belt seen above and to the left of the cathedral spire. In Greek mythology, Orion was a powerful hunter blinded by ego and his own greatness, but was ultimately brought down by the pinprick of a scorpion's sting.

== The sad clown paradox ==
The sad clown paradox is the concept of someone who, while appearing joyful, harbors sadness. This painting represents the same concept - Stańczyk is a jester whose job is to entertain, yet he is shown in a moment of hopelessness. The colors of the dark room, in contrast with the bright colors of the ball, convey this theme.

== History, significance and historiography ==
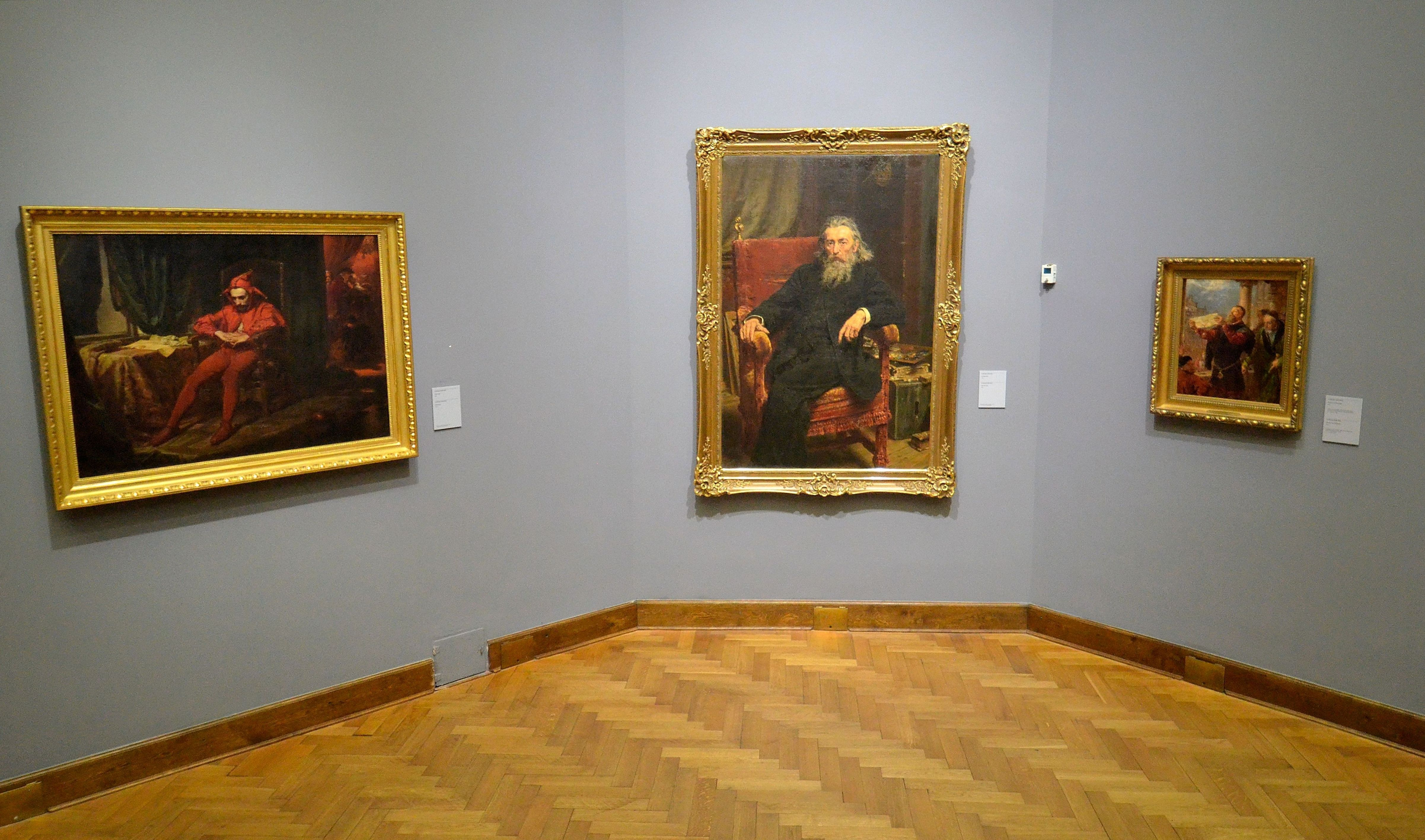
Stańczyk (left) displayed in the National Museum in Warsaw

Matejko was fascinated by Stańczyk from the times of his youth, and portrayed him in several of his works (most notably, besides the painting discussed here, in Consecration of King Sigismund's Bell, 1874 and Prussian Homage, 1882). Working on this painting, Matejko was also inspired by the book Król zamczyska by Seweryn Goszczyński, whose main character – a loner, living in the castle's ruins, trying to reconcile past and present, and himself inspired by Stańczyk – likely influenced this painting. Completed in 1862, when Matejko was twenty-four years old, it is one of his most famous works and the one that launched him to fame. It is seen as a key painting for the understanding of Matejko's style and intentions in his art. Matejko used his own face for Stańczyk, and with this work began a series of paintings analyzing and interpreting the History of Poland through the figure of Stańczyk.

The painting is also seen as highly significant for the culture of Poland in general. According to the National Museum in Warsaw, Stańczyk is one of the most recognizable paintings in its collection, and is a flagship painting for the "Collection of Polish paintings prior to 1914". The painting has created an image of Stańczyk that has become iconic and has been repeated in other works such as the play Wesele (1901) of Stanisław Wyspiański. Matejko's most famous paintings are usually large, group scenes; individual scenes are less common in his work.

Upon its creation, the painting did not gather much attention, and was acquired by the Kraków Society of Friends of Fine Arts for a purpose of a gift lottery. It was subsequently won by a certain individual, Korytko, in whose possession it was slightly damaged. Upon Matejko's rise to fame, the painting was rediscovered and applauded as a masterpiece, and acquired by the National Museum in Warsaw in 1924. During World War II it was looted by the Nazis. It was subsequently seized by the Soviet Union and returned to Poland around 1956.

The painting is featured on the back cover of Lady Gaga's 2024 album Harlequin, a companion album to the 2024 film Joker: Folie à Deux.

The painting was exhibited in the Louvre from October 2024 until February 2025 as part of the exhibition entitled Figures of the Fool: From the Middle Ages to the Romantics.

== See also ==
- Art in Poland
