= Siege of Smolensk (1514) =

Siege that took place in Smolensk in 1514

- Part of the Muscovite–Lithuanian Wars
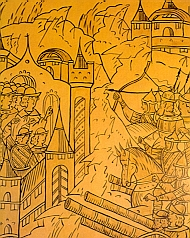
- Siege of Smolensk
| Date | 1 August 1514 |
| Location | Smolensk 54°47′N 32°04′E |
| Result | Russian victory |

Belligerents
| Grand Duchy of Moscow | Grand Duchy of Lithuania |

Commanders and leaders
| Vasili III of Russia; Michael Glinski | Jurij Sołłohub |

Strength
| 140 to 300 cannons | |

The siege of Smolensk of 1514 took place during the fourth Muscovite–Lithuanian War (1512–1520).

The growing and strengthening Grand Duchy of Moscow clashed with the Grand Duchy of Lithuania over the territories of the former Rus'. The tension resulted in a series of wars starting in 1492. When war broke out again in November 1512, Moscow's main objective was to capture Smolensk, an important fortress and trade center that had been part of Lithuania since 1404. The Russians, commanded personally by Tsar Vasili III of Russia, laid a six-week siege in January–February 1513, but Grand Hetman Konstanty Ostrogski repelled the attack. Another four-week siege followed in August–September 1513.

In May 1514, Vasili III again led his army against Smolensk. This time the Russian army included a number of mercenary artillerymen and landsknechts, brought from the Holy Roman Empire by Michael Glinski. After a lengthy preparation, shelling of the city from nearby hills began in July. After a few days Jurij Sołłohub, Voivode of Smolensk, agreed to surrender on 30 July 1514. Vasili III entered the city the next day.

The Lithuanians won a great victory in the Battle of Orsha in September 1514, but were unable to recapture Smolensk. To commemorate his victory Vasili III built the Novodevichy Convent within the Moscow Kremlin. Smolensk remained part of Russia until the Siege of Smolensk (1609–1611) during the Polish–Muscovite War (1605–1618). In 1654 it returned to Russian Empire.

== See also ==
- Siege of Smolensk (1609–11)
- Stańczyk (painting)
