= Julian Klaczko =

Polish author

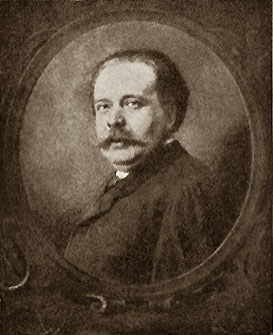
Julian Klaczko

Julian Klaczko (6 November 1825, Vilna (Wilno, Vilnius) – 26 November 1906, Kraków) was a Polish author, proficient in Hebrew, Polish, French, and German.

He was born Jehuda Lejb into a wealthy Jewish family. At the age of 17 he published a book of Hebrew poetry called "Duda'im" (דודאים), as well as translating Polish literary works into Hebrew.

He studied in Wilno and Königsberg (Królewiec), his interests including philosophy, history and literature. In 1847, he earned a PhD (doctorate work De rebus Franco-Gallicis saeculi XV). He then moved to Heidelberg, and published in the liberal Deutsche Zeitung.

After the failure of the Poznań uprising (1848) he emigrated to France where he lived for the following 20 years. In Paris he changed his name and converted to Roman Catholic Christianity (1856), after his father's death. He was a co-editor of Wiadomości Polskie, and published in Revue de Paris, Revue Contemporaine, and Revue des Deux Mondes (since 1862).

Klaczko was a politician who co-operated with the liberal-aristocratic Hotel Lambert faction of Polish exiles (Prince Adam Jerzy Czartoryski). As a Polish nationalist, he expressed an outspoken resentment and hatred of Russia and Prussia for their share in the Partition of Poland, but had a more positive attitude towards Austria-Hungary, with its relatively more tolerant policies towards the Poles under its rule.

In 1869 he moved to Vienna, and was in 1870 elected Privy Councillor ("Hofrat") at the Foreign Affairs Ministry of Austria-Hungary. He was also a member of the Galician Parliament (1870–71) and later of the Imperial Parliament, the Reichsrat. During the Franco-Prussian War of 1870-71 he agitated intensely for an Austro-Hungarian intervention on the French side. For these (unsuccessful) efforts, Bismark called him "A Jewish agent of France".

In the 1870s he lived for some years in Italy. Also when moving to Kraków, where he spent his last years, he was involved in researching on Italian literature and art. He is buried at Rakowicki Cemetery in Kraków.
