= Samuel Janus =

American psychotherapist and author (1930–2011)

Samuel Janus (November 22, 1930 – February 7, 2011) was an American psychotherapist and author who specialized in investigating the sexual exploitation of children. He died on February 7, 2011, at the age of 80.

== Bibliography ==
- The Death of Innocence - how our children are endangered by the new sexual freedom. William Morrow and Co, New York, 1981, ISBN 978-0-688-00136-0
- A Sexual Profile of Men in Power. Prentice Hall, 1977, 978–0138074876
- The Janus Report on Sexual Behaviour, Samuel Janus and Cynthia Janus, 1993. James Wiley and Sons
