= Józef Szujski =

Polish politician (1835–1883)

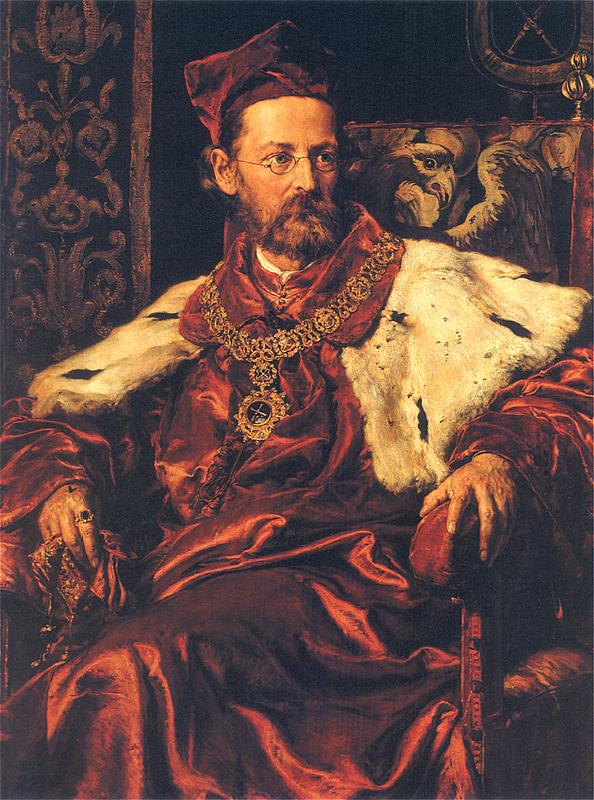
- Born: 16 June 1835; Tarnów
- Died: 7 February 1883 (aged 47); Kraków
- Occupations: Poet, Professor of the Jagiellonian University
- Writing career
- Language: Polish
- Period: 19th century

Józef Szujski (16 June 1835 – 7 February 1883) was a Polish politician, historian, poet and professor of the Jagiellonian University.

== Life ==
Szujski was born on 16 June 1835 in Tarnów. He studied at Tarnów, then at Kraków (1854) and at Vienna (1858–1859). He began his career as a poet, and continued to write verses till the end of his life. Apart from many short lyrical poems, his first attempts were dramatic: Samuel Zborowski, Halszka of Ostrog, and a translation of the Agamemnon of Æschylus. Before his marriage (1861) he had also published his Portraits, not by Van Dyck, in which various types of Poles are characterized. He began working at a manual of Polish history, publishing two volumes in 1862, but was presently convinced of the necessity of independent research, which features in volumes three and four (1864–1866).

The insurrection of 1863 was a blow to Szujski's hopes for Poland's future, and he resolved to devote his whole life to seeking the causes of his country's misfortunes, with a view to her regeneration. At the time that he was publishing the poems: The Servant of the Tombs, The Defence of Czestochowa, and the dramas, George Lubomirski and Wallas, he placed himself in the front rank of Polish historians by his work Some Truths of our History (1865). "No nation", he said, "can fall save through her own fault, nor rise again, save by her own intelligent labour and spiritual activity". He founded the "Polish Review" (1866), and the next year brought out "Hedwige" and "Twardowski", both dramas.

When the use of the national language was restored in Kraków University, Szujski was named (1869) professor of Polish history; later, he was chosen as rector. As early as 1872, he was reportedly the moving spirit of the Academy of Sciences at Kraków in his capacity as secretary. His researches were not confined to Poland: at about that time, he published a sketch of the literary history of the non-Christian world; studies on Marcus Aurelius and on Lucian; translations from Æschylus and Aristophanes; Maryna Mnischowna, and The Death of Ladislaus IV, dramas of his own, together with several other works. After his rectorate (1879) Szujski was made a peer. But his health, which had always been precarious, now failed completely, and tuberculosis set in. He continued to work, however, till he could work no more. He died in Kraków on 7 February 1883, at the age of 47.

His history, first sketched in four volumes, from the 16th century on, was supplemented by three other volumes, entitled Relations and Researches. It has been said of him that "the historian killed the poet".
