= Zasanie Synagogue =

Former synagogue in Przemyśl, Poland

- Polish: Synagoga Zasańska
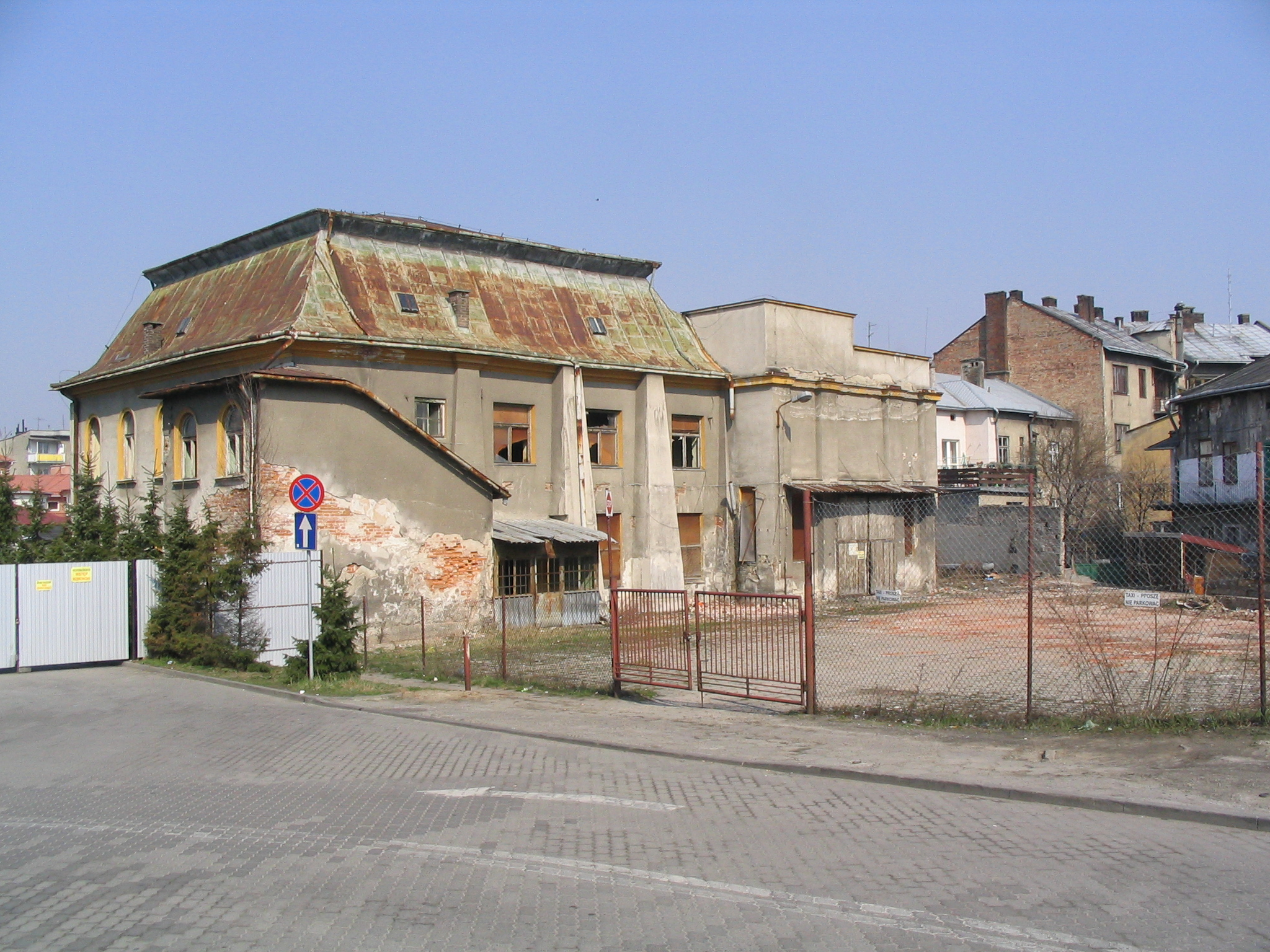
- The abandoned former synagogue in 2007

- Location of the former synagogue in Subcarpathian Voivodeship

Religion
- Affiliation: Judaism (former)
- Rite: Nusach Ashkenaz
- Ecclesiastical or organizational status: Synagogue (1909–1939 (Note: Although one source claims its use a synagogue ceased in 1928.)); Profane use (since 1929)
- Status: Abandoned; Sold to private interests

Location
- Location: Plac Unii Brzeskiej 6, Przemyśl, Subcarpathian Voivodeship
- Country: Poland
- Interactive map of Zasanie Synagogue
- Coordinates: 49°47′13″N 22°45′55″E

Architecture
- Type: Synagogue architecture
- Style: Baroque Revival
- Founder: The Society for the Israelite House of Worship in Zasanie
- Groundbreaking: 1892
- Completed: 1909

The Zasanie Synagogue (Polish: Synagoga Zasańska) is a former Jewish congregation and synagogue, located in Przemyśl, in Subcarpathian Voivodeship, Poland. It was the only synagogue in Przemyśl built on the western bank of the San River. Completed in 1909, it served as a house of prayer for thirty years until World War II. Along with the New Synagogue, the Zasanie Synagogue is one of the two remaining synagogue buildings in Przemyśl.

== History ==
The synagogue was built by the "Society for the Israelite House of Worship in Zasanie", Zasanie being the district of Przemyśl located on the western bank of the San River. Construction was started in 1892 and it was finally opened in 1909.

In 1939 when the area fell under Nazi occupation it was turned into a temporary power station. After the war the building was used as a garage, first for buses and then for ambulances.

In 1994 attempts were made to purchase the building and convert it into an art gallery and center for the artists of Przemyśl. It was planned to renamed the building in honor of a famous Przemyśl Jewish artist and include a permanent exhibit commemorating the contributions of the Jews of Przemyśl, their history, and display photographs and accounts of the Holocaust. However, in 2005 it was bought by private local businessman Robert Błażkowski. The building remains wrecked, closed and abandoned.

== See also ==
- History of the Jews in Poland
- List of active synagogues in Poland
