= Tempel Synagogue (Przemyśl) =

Destroyed synagogue in Przemyśl, Poland

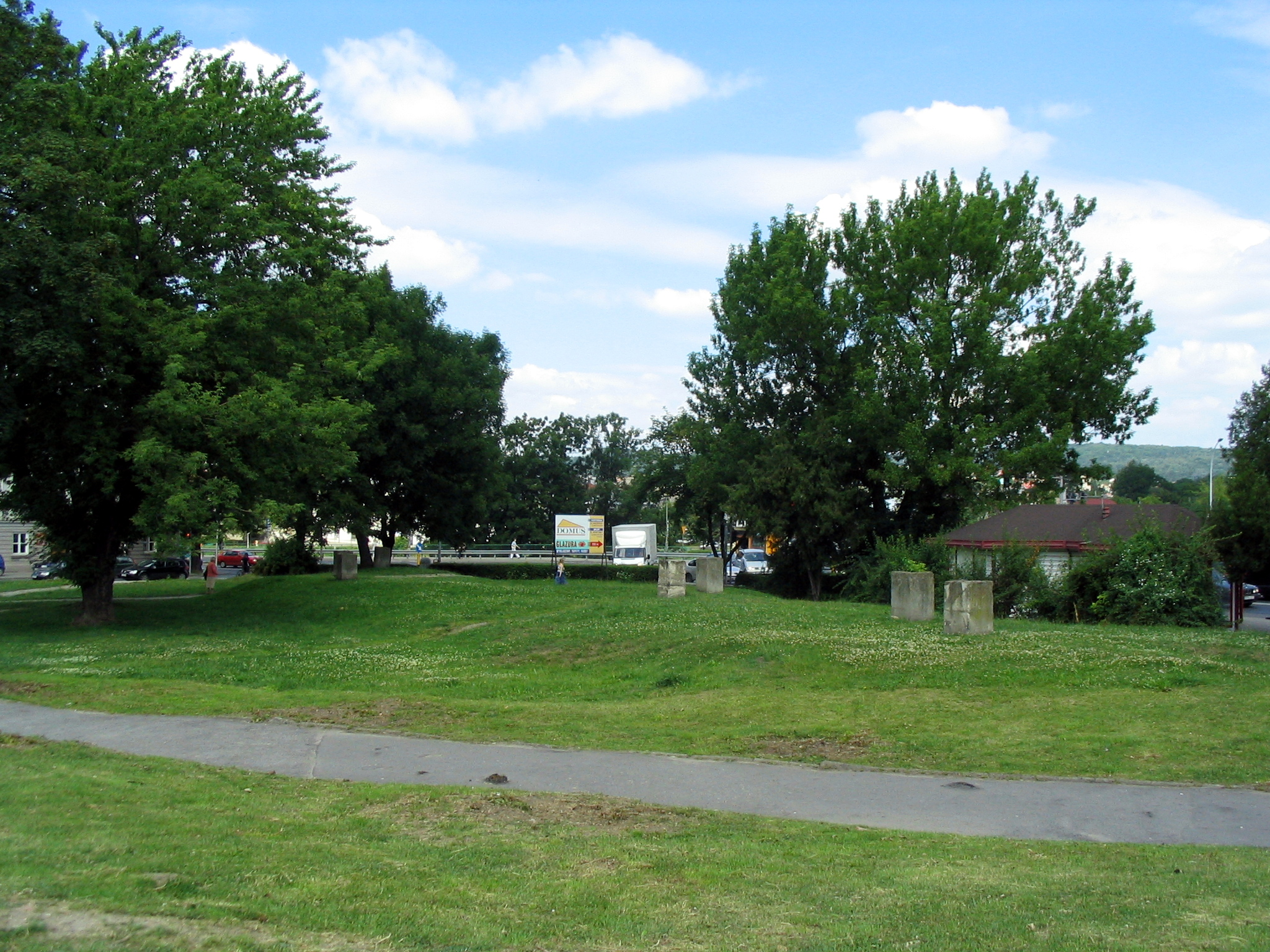
- Site of the former synagogue, in 2008

- Location of the destroyed synagogue in Podkarpackie Voivodeship

Religion
- Affiliation: Reform Judaism (former)
- Ecclesiastical or organizational status: Synagogue (1890–1939)
- Status: Destroyed

Location
- Location: Jagiellonska Street, Przemyśl, Podkarpackie Voivodeship
- Country: Poland
- Interactive map of Tempel Synagogue
- Coordinates: 49°47′02″N 22°46′16″E

Architecture
- Architect: Stanisław Majerski
- Type: Synagogue architecture
- Style: Romanesque Revival; Rundbogenstil
- Established: c. 1588 (as a congregation)
- Completed: 1890
- Destroyed: November 1939
- Materials: Brick

The Tempel Synagogue was a former Reform Jewish congregation and synagogue, that was located on Jagiellonska Street, in Przemyśl, in the Podkarpackie Voivodeship of Poland. Designed by Stanisław Majerski and completed in 1890, the synagogue served as a house of prayer until World War II when it was destroyed by Nazis in November 1939.

== History ==
The Tempel Synagogue stood on Jagiellonska Street, on the river San. It was dedicated on September 18, 1890. The substantial brick building was built in the Romanesque Revival derived style known as Rundbogenstil, a popular architectural style for nineteenth and early twentieth century synagogues. It was designed by architect Stanisław Majerski (1872–1926,) a graduate of the Lwów Politechnical School. Brick red brick, the unplastered building of the synagogue was erected on a square plan. The main door was accessed via a wide staircase. The front wall was crowned by two Moses plaques. The synagogue was modelled on Austrian and Western European synagogues. The interior looked very rich, on the eastern wall there was Aron ha-kodesh, which stood between two boards of the Decalogue. It was the only synagogue in Przemysl where Polish prayers were prayed and services were held on the occasion of the most important public holidays.

Until the war, the synagogue had a choir led by Kantor Rosenberg, accompanied by organ. However, unlike twentieth century Reform synagogues, the Temple had a separate women's gallery while men sat on the first floor. It was burned by the Germans in 1939; the ruins were destroyed by 1956.

== See also ==
- History of the Jews in Poland
- List of active synagogues in Poland
