= Przemyśl =

- City county
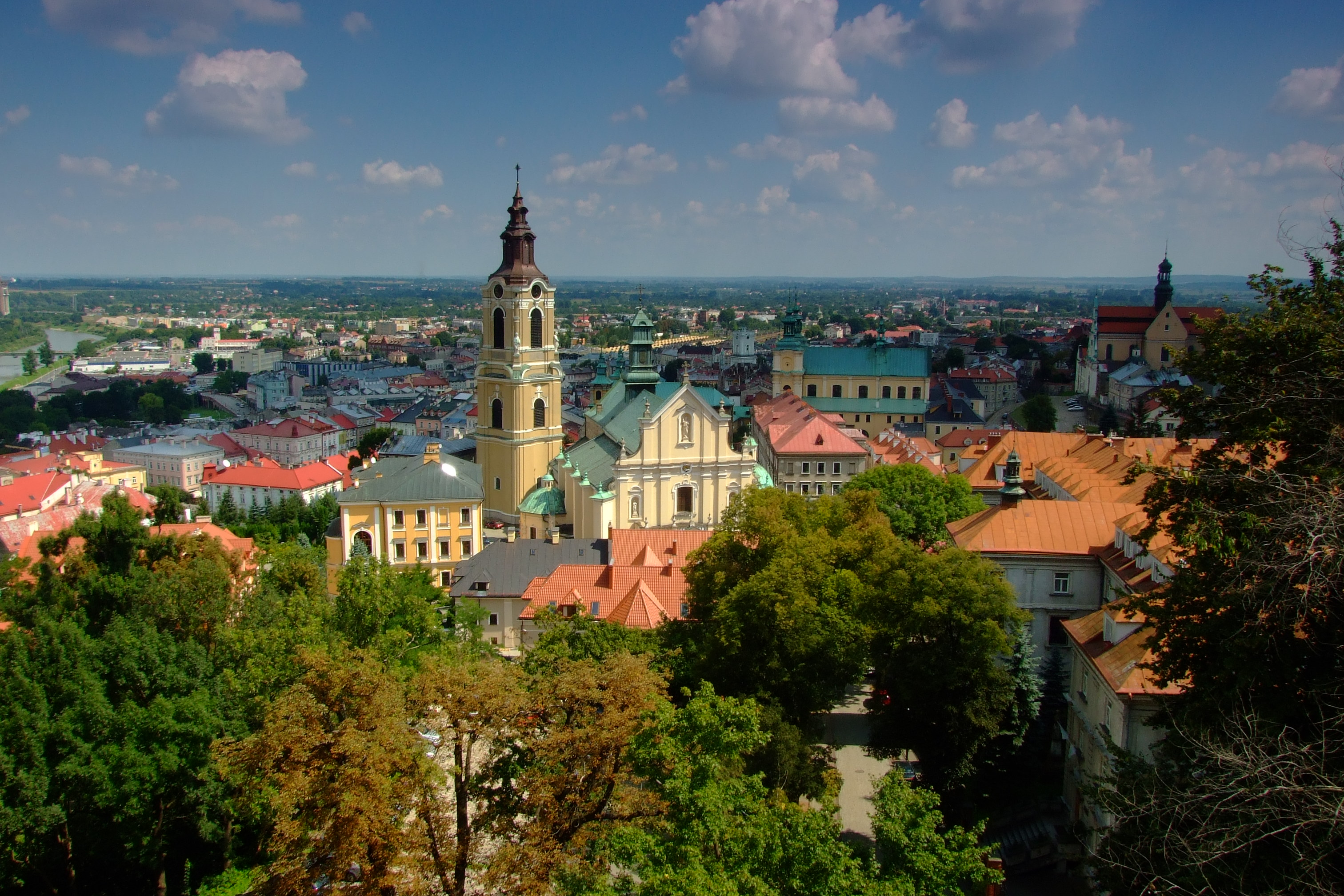
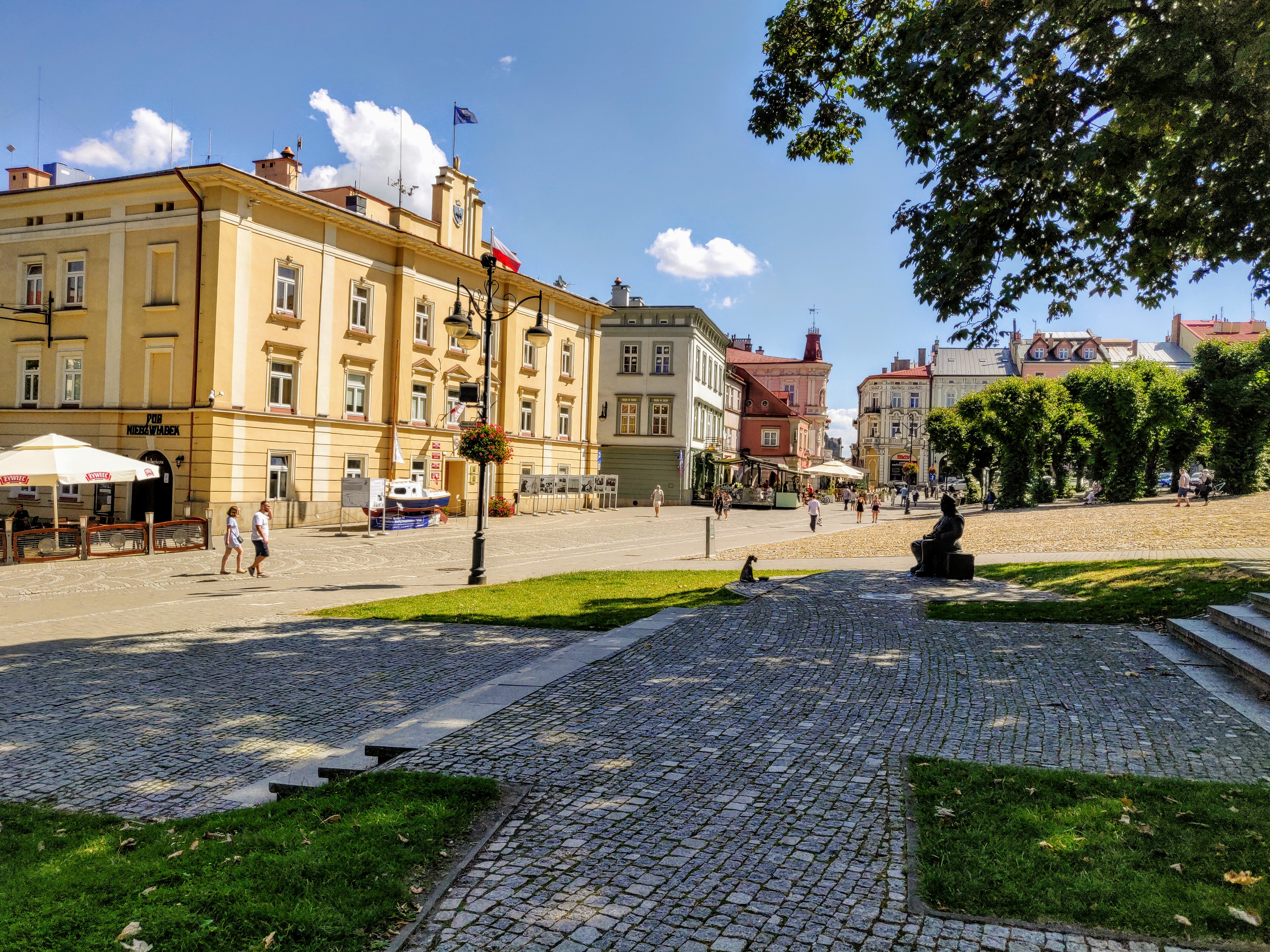
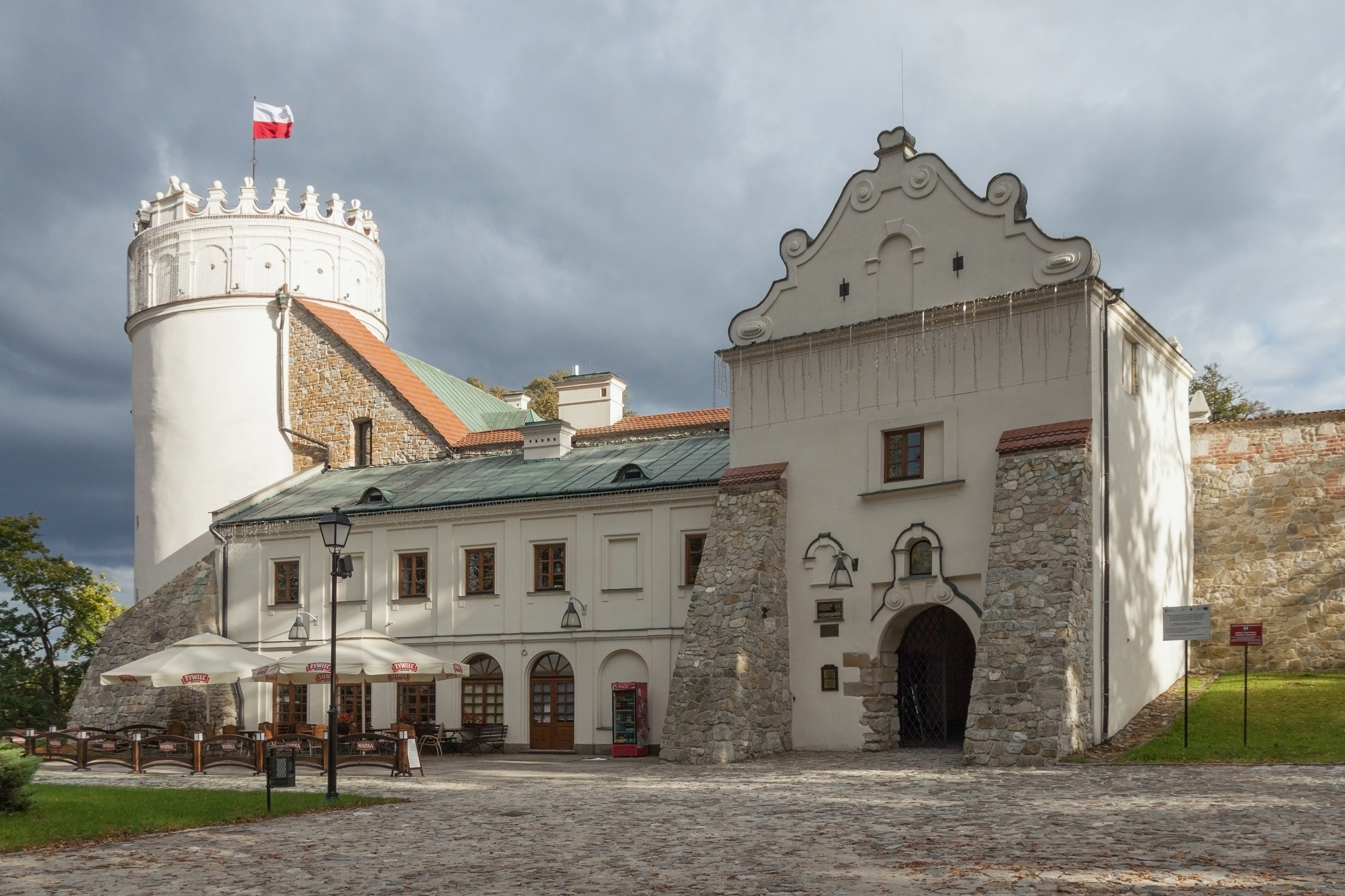
- Przemyśl Cathedral and Old Town Market Square Royal Castle

- Flag Coat of arms

- Location within Poland
- Coordinates: 49°47′N 22°46′E
- Country: Poland
- Voivodeship: Subcarpathian
- County: city county
- Established: c. 8th century
- City rights: 1389

Government
  - City mayor: Wojciech Bakun

Area
  - Total: 44 km^{2} (17 sq mi)

Population (30.06.2023)
  - Total: 56,466 ▼
  - Density: 1,300/km^{2} (3,300/sq mi)
- Time zone: UTC+1 (CET)
  - Summer (DST): UTC+2 (CEST)
- Postal code: 37–700 to 37–720
- Area code: +48 16
- Car plates: RP
- Website: www.przemysl.pl

Historic Monument of Poland
- Official name: Przemyśl – Old Town ensemble
- Designated: 2018-12-10
- Reference no.: Dz. U., 2018, No. 2419

Przemyśl (Note: Latin: Premislia; Yiddish: פשעמישל, romanized: Pshemishl; Ukrainian: Перемишль, romanized: Peremyshl; German: Premissel) (Polish: [ˈpʂɛmɨɕl]) is a city in southeastern Poland with 56,466 inhabitants, as of December 2023. In 1999, it became part of the Subcarpathian Voivodeship. It was previously the capital of Przemyśl Voivodeship.

Przemyśl owes its long and rich history to the advantages of its geographic location. The city lies in an area connecting mountains and lowlands known as the Przemyśl Gate (Brama Przemyska), with open lines of transport, and fertile soil. It also lies on the navigable San River. Important trade routes that connect Central Europe from Przemyśl ensure the city's importance. The Old Town of Przemyśl is listed as a Historic Monument of Poland.

== Names ==
Different names in various languages have identified the city throughout its history. Selected languages include: Czech: Přemyšl; German: Premissel, Prömsel, Premslen; Latin: Premislia; Russian: Перемышль (Peremyšl'); Ukrainian: Перемишль (Peremyshl^{j}) and Пшемисль (Pshemysl^{j}); and Yiddish: פּשעמישל (Pshemishl).

== History ==
=== Origins ===
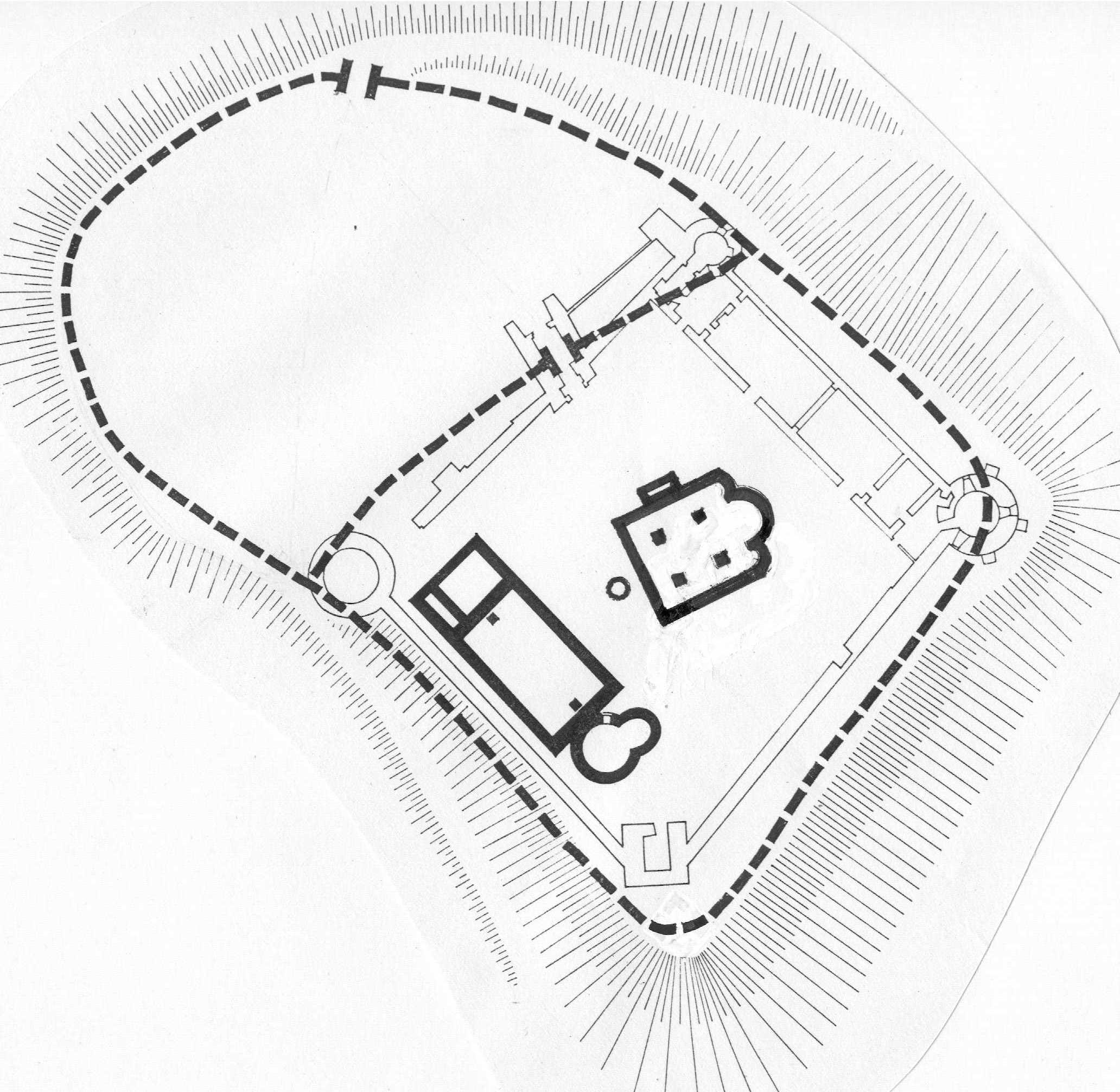
Foundations of a Lendian gord, and of a Latin rotunda chapel and palatium complex built by Bolesław I the Brave of Poland in the 11th century, along with an Orthodox tserkva built in the 12th century.

Przemyśl is the second-oldest city (after Kraków) in southeastern Poland, dating back to the 8th century. It was the site of a fortified gord belonging to the Lędzianie (Lendians), a West Slavic tribe. In the 9th century, the fortified settlement and the surrounding region became part of Great Moravia. Most likely, the city's name dates back to the Moravian period. Also, archaeological remains testify to the presence of a Christian monastic settlement as early as the 9th century.

Upon the invasion of the Hungarian tribes into the heart of the Great Moravian Empire around 899, the local Lendians declared allegiance to the Hungarians. The region then became a site of contention between Poland, Kievan Rus and Hungary beginning in at least the 9th century, with Przemyśl along with other Cherven Grods, falling under the control of the Polans (Polanie), who would in the 10th century under the rule of Mieszko I establish the Polish state. When Mieszko I annexed the tribal area of Lendians in 970–980, Przemyśl became an important local centre on the eastern frontier of Piast's realm.

The city was mentioned by Nestor the Chronicler, when in 981 it was captured by Vladimir I of Kiev. In 1018, Przemyśl returned to Poland, and in 1031 it was retaken by the Rus'. Around the year 1069, Przemyśl again returned to Poland, after Bolesław II the Generous retook the town and temporarily made it his residence. In 1085, the town became the capital of a semi-independent Principality of Peremyshl under the lordship of Kievan Rus'.

The palatium complex including a Latin rotunda was built during the rule of the Polish king Bolesław I the Brave in the 11th century. Sometime before 1218, an Orthodox eparchy was founded in the city. Przemyśl later became part of the Kingdom of Galicia–Volhynia, during which it became the starting point for the Bârlad Trail. From 1246 onwards, like all of Kyivan Rus, Przemyśl was under Mongol suzerainty.

=== Kingdom of Poland and the Polish–Lithuanian Commonwealth ===
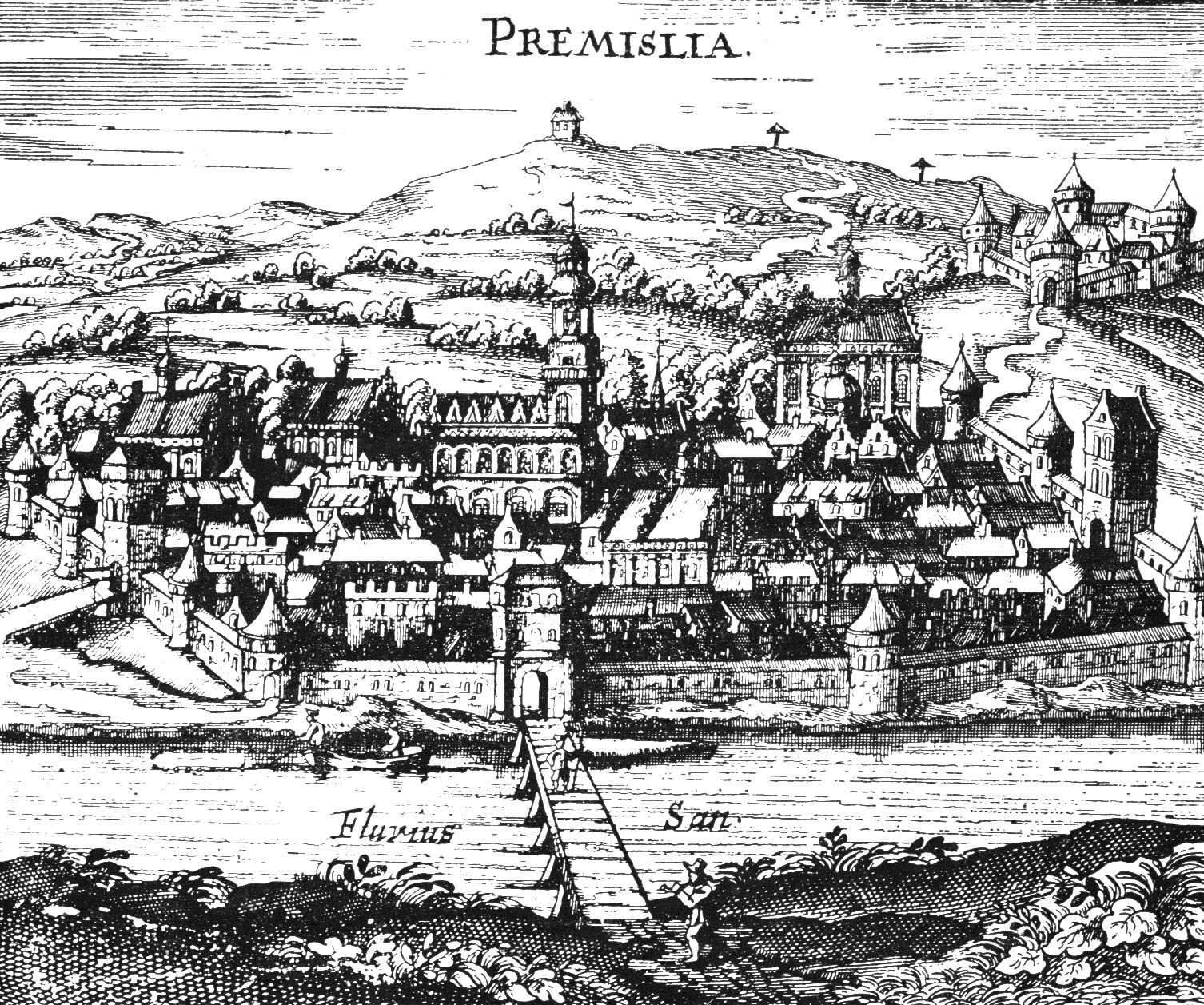
Early 17th century graphic depicting Przemyśl during the Polish–Lithuanian Commonwealth era.

In 1340, Przemyśl was retaken by the king Casimir III of Poland and again became part of the Kingdom of Poland as result of the Galicia–Volhynia Wars. Around this time, the first Latin Catholic Archdiocese of Premislia was founded in the city, and the city was granted a city charter based on Magdeburg rights, confirmed in 1389 by the king Vladislav II Jagiello.The city prospered as an important trade centre during the 16th century. Like nearby Lviv, the city's population consisted of a great number of nationalities, including Poles, Jews, Germans, Czechs, Armenians, and Ruthenians. The long period of prosperity enabled the construction of public buildings such as the Renaissance town hall and the Old Synagogue of 1559. Also, a Jesuit college was founded in the city in 1617.

The prosperity came to an end in the middle of the 17th century, caused by the invading Swedish army during the Deluge, and a general decline of the Polish–Lithuanian Commonwealth. The city's decline lasted for over a hundred years, and only at the end of the 18th century did it recover its former levels of population. In 1754, the Latin Catholic bishop founded Przemyśl's first public library, which was only the second public library in the Polish–Lithuanian Commonwealth, with Warsaw's Załuski Library founded seven years earlier. Przemyśl's importance at that time was such that when Austria annexed eastern Galicia in 1772 the Austrians considered making Przemyśl their provincial capital, before deciding on Lviv. In the mid-18th century, Jews constituted 55.6% (1,692) of the population, Latin Catholic Poles 39.5% (1,202), and Greek Catholic Ruthenians 4.8% (147).

=== Part of Austrian Poland ===
In 1772, as a consequence of the First Partition of Poland, Przemyśl became part of the Austrian Empire, in what the Austrians called the Kingdom of Galicia and Lodomeria. According to the Austrian census of 1830, the city was home to 7,538 people of whom 3,732 were Latin Catholic, 2,298 Jews and 1,508 were members of the Greek Catholic Church, a significantly larger number of Ruthenians than in most Galician cities. In 1804, a Ruthenian library was established in Przemyśl. By 1822, its collection had over 33,000 books and its importance for Ruthenians was comparable to that held by the Ossolineum library in Lwów for Poles. Przemyśl also became the centre of the revival of Byzantine choral music in the Greek Catholic Church. Until eclipsed by Lviv in the 1830s, Przemyśl was the most important city in the Ruthenian cultural awakening in the nineteenth century. As the majority of Przemyśl's inhabitants were Poles, the city also became a centre for the development of Polish culture and science, and Polish independence organisations also operated in Przemyśl. The greatest heyday of Polishness in Przemyśl dates back to 1860-1918, due to the granting of autonomy to Galicia.

In 1861, the Galician Railway of Archduke Charles Louis built a connecting line from Przemyśl to Kraków, and east to Lwów. In the middle of the 19th century, due to the growing conflict between Austria and Russia over the Balkans, Austria grew more mindful of Przemyśl's strategic location near the border with the Russian Empire. During the Crimean War, when tensions mounted between Russia and Austria, a series of massive fortresses, 15 km (9 mi) in circumference, were built around the city by the Austrian military.

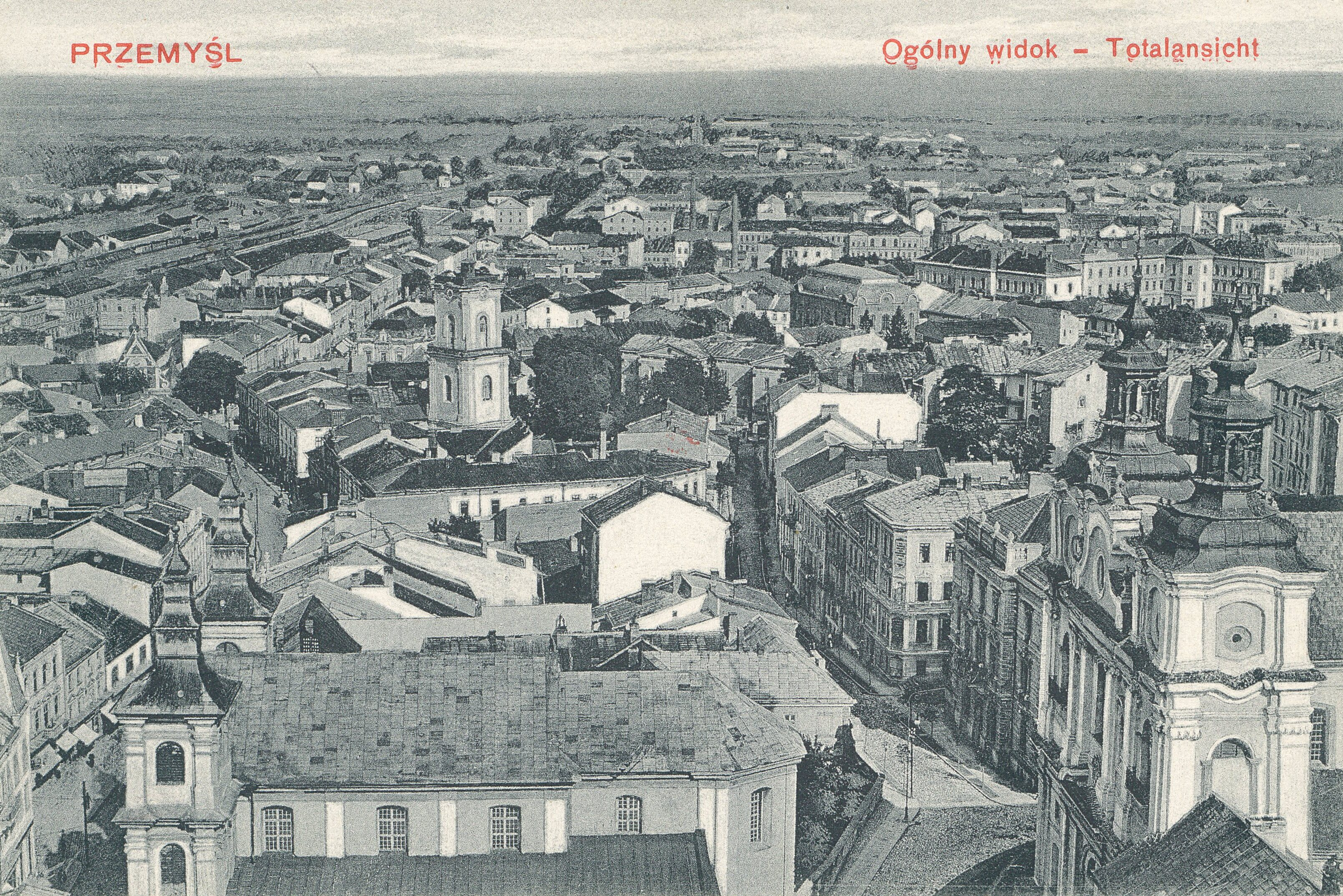
Przemyśl before 1914

In 1909, the Polish "Museum of the Przemyśl Land" was established in Przemyśl. It was an extremely important facility for the Polish population.

The census of 1910, showed that the city had 54,078 residents. Latin Catholics were the most numerous 25,306 (46.8%), followed by Jews 16,062 (29.7%) and Greek Catholics 12,018 (22.2%). 87% of the city's inhabitants spoke Polish. All Poles spoke Polish, and most Jews were bilingual and communicated in Yiddish and Polish, but owing to the inability to declare Yiddish, almost all Jews declared the Polish language.

==== World War I (Przemyśl Fortress) ====
With technological progress in artillery during the second half of the 19th century, the old fortifications rapidly became obsolete. The longer range of rifled artillery necessitated the redesign of fortresses so that they would be larger and able to resist the newly available guns. To achieve this, between the years 1888 and 1914 Przemyśl was turned into a first-class fortress, the third-largest in Europe out of about 200 that were built in this period. Around the city, in a circle of circumference 45 km (28 mi), 44 forts of various sizes were built. The older fortifications were modernised to provide the fortress with an internal defence ring. The fortress was designed to accommodate 85,000 soldiers and 956 cannons of all sorts, although eventually 120,000 soldiers were garrisoned there.

In August 1914, at the beginning of the First World War, Russian forces defeated Austro-Hungarian forces in the opening engagements and advanced rapidly into Galicia. The Przemyśl fortress fulfilled its mission very effectively, helping to stop a 300,000-strong Russian army advancing upon the Carpathian Passes and Kraków, the Lesser Poland regional capital. The first siege was lifted by a temporary Austro-Hungarian advance. However, the Russian army resumed its advance and initiated a second siege of the fortress of Przemyśl in October 1914. This time relief attempts were unsuccessful. Due to lack of food and exhaustion of its defenders, the fortress surrendered on 22 March 1915. The Russians captured 126,000 prisoners and 700 big guns. Before the surrender, the complete destruction of all fortifications was carried out. The Russians did not linger in Przemyśl. A renewed offensive by the Central Powers recaptured the destroyed fortress on 3 June 1915. During the fighting around Przemyśl, both sides lost up to 115,000 killed, wounded, and missing.

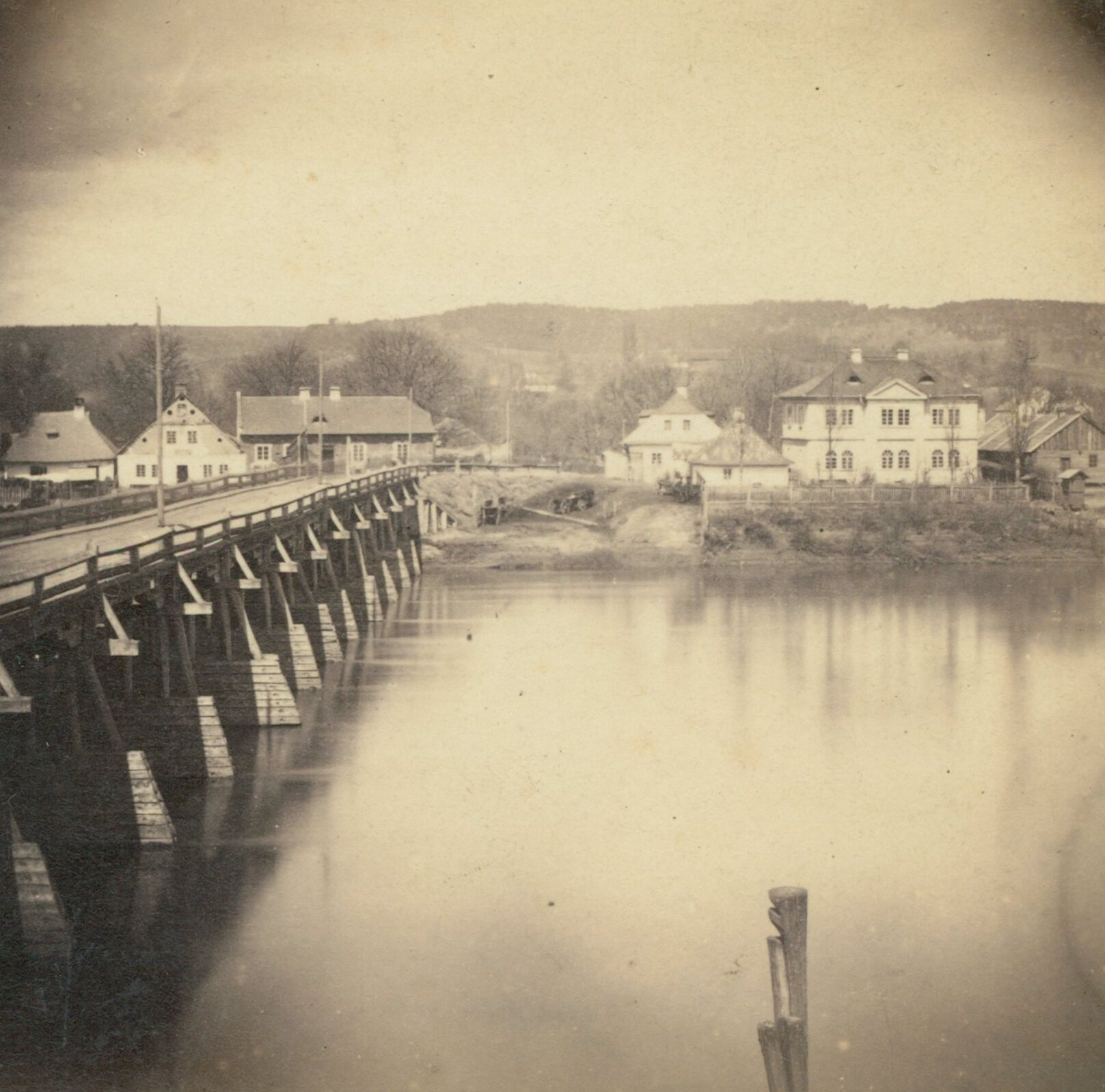
Wooden bridge, ca 1865

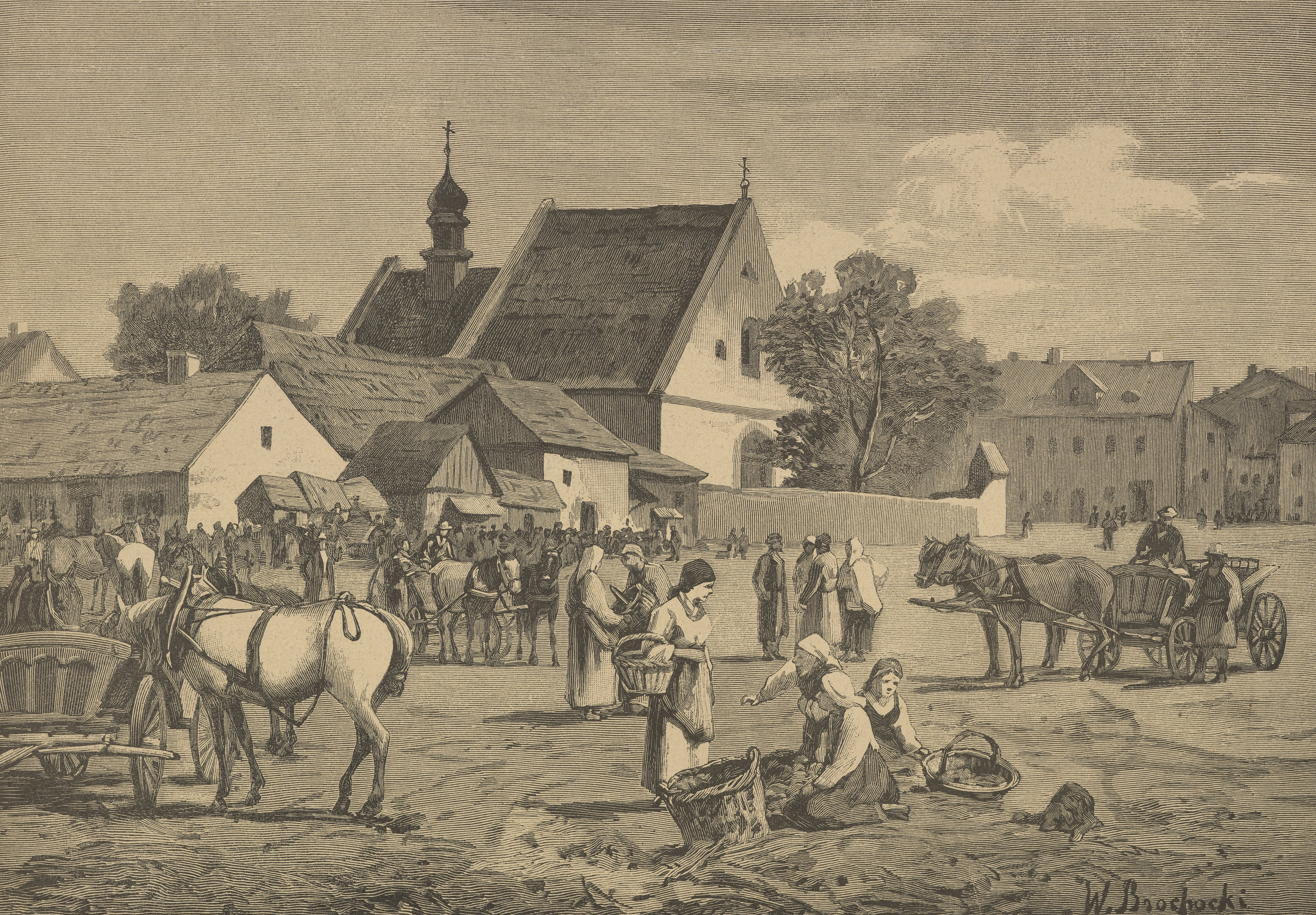
Saint Anthony of Padua church, 1886

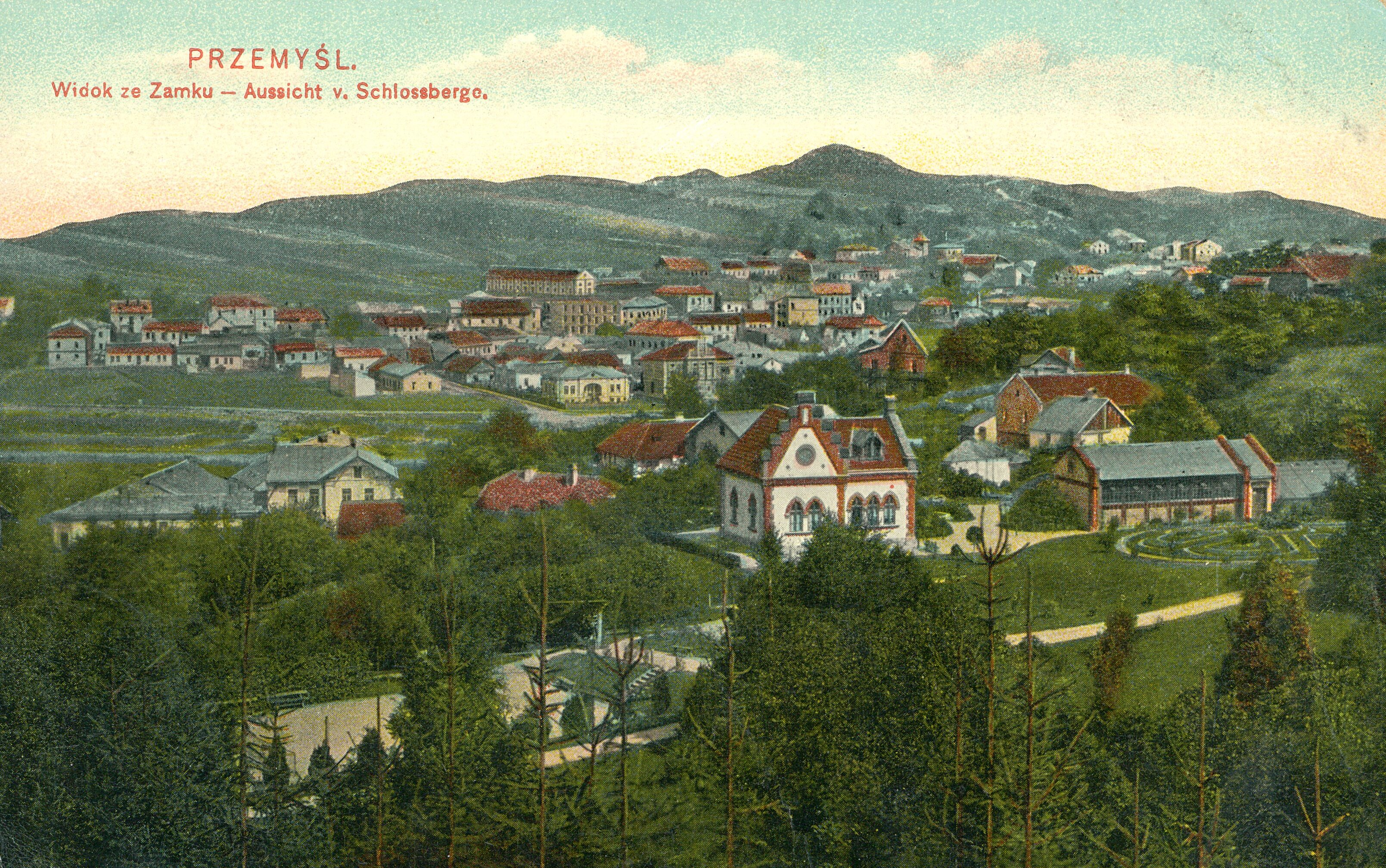
City view, 1908

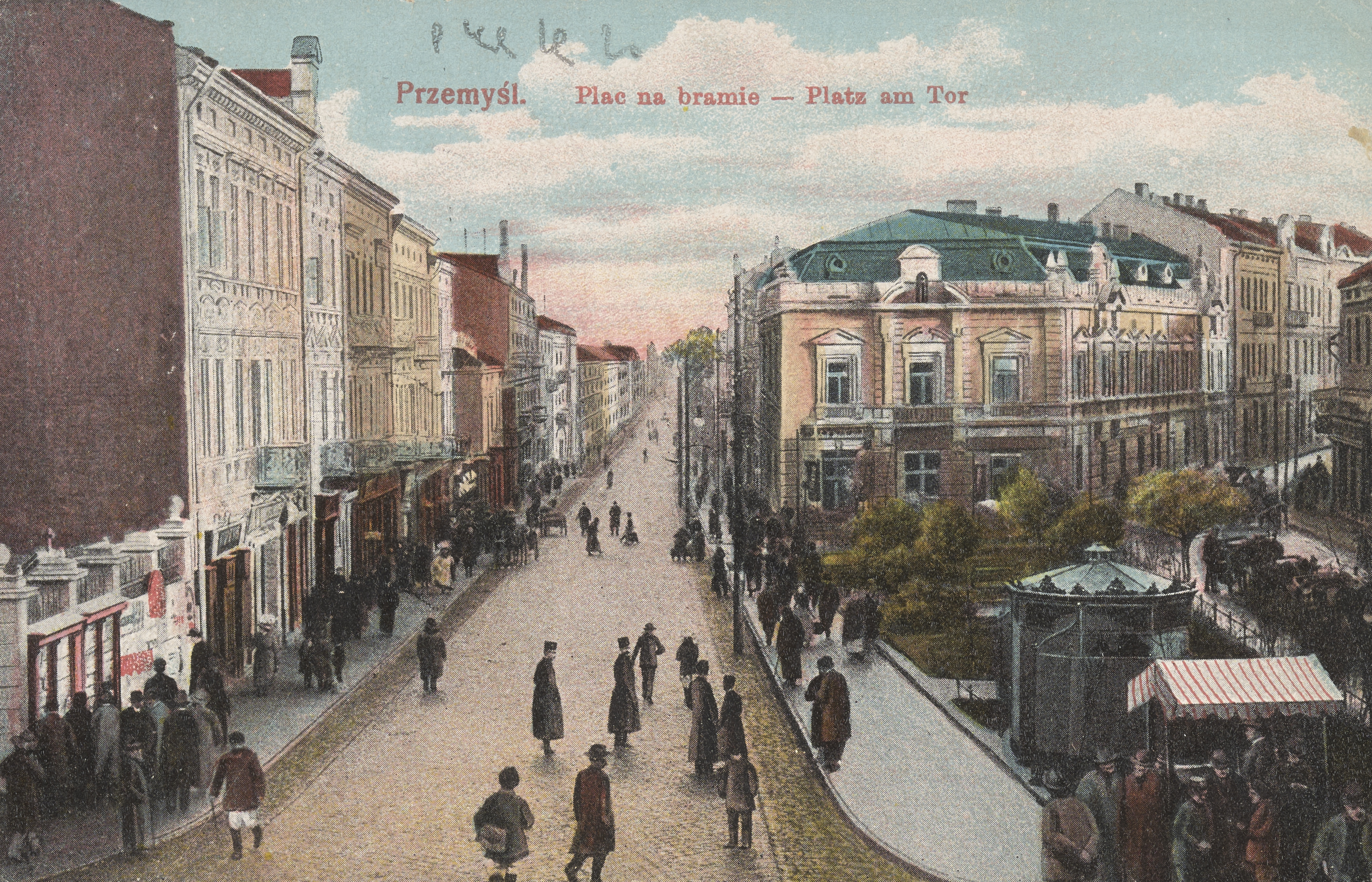
Na Bramie Square, 1911

=== Second Polish Republic ===
Population of Przemyśl, 1931

Latin Catholics (Poles)	39 430	(63,3%)
Jews	18 376	(29,5%)
Greek Catholics (Ukrainians)	4 391	(7,0%)
Other denominations	85	(0,2%)
Total	62 272

Source: 1931 Polish census

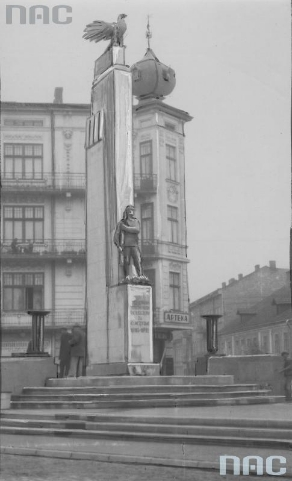
Monument to the Przemyśl Eaglets first erected in 1938

At the end of World War I, Przemyśl became disputed between renascent Poland and the West Ukrainian People's Republic. On 1 November 1918, a local provisional government was formed with representatives of Polish, Jewish, and Ruthenian inhabitants of the area. However, on 3 November, a Ukrainian military unit overthrew the government, arrested its leader and captured the eastern part of the city. The Ukrainian army was checked by a small Polish self-defence unit formed of World War I veterans. Also, numerous young Polish volunteers from Przemyśl's high schools, later to be known as Przemyśl Orlęta, The Eaglets of Przemyśl (in a similar manner to more famous Lwów Eaglets), joined the host. The battlefront divided the city along the river San, with the western borough of Zasanie held in Polish hands and the Old Town controlled by the Ukrainians. Neither Poles nor Ukrainians could effectively cross the San river, so both opposing parties decided to wait for a relief force from the outside. That race was won by the Polish reinforcements and the volunteer expeditionary unit formed in Kraków arrived in Przemyśl on 10 November 1918. When the subsequent Polish ultimatum to the Ukrainians remained unanswered, on 11–12 November the Polish forces crossed the San and forced out the outnumbered Ukrainians from the city in what became known as the 1918 Battle of Przemyśl.

After the end of the Polish–Ukrainian War and the Polish–Bolshevik War that followed, the city became a part of the Second Polish Republic. Although the capital of the voivodeship was in Lwów (see: Lwów Voivodeship), Przemyśl recovered its nodal position as a seat of local church administration, as well as the garrison of the 10th Military District of the Polish Army — a staff unit charged with organizing the defence of roughly 10% of the territory of pre-war Poland. As of 1931, Przemyśl had a population of 62,272 and was the biggest city in southeastern Poland between Kraków and Lwów.

==== World War II ====
On 11–14 September 1939, during the invasion of Poland, which started World War II, the German and Polish armies fought the Battle of Przemyśl in and around the city. After the battle German Einsatzgruppe I entered the city to commit various atrocities against the population, and the Einsatzgruppe zbV entered to take over the Polish industry. The battle was followed by three days of massacres carried out by the German soldiers, police and Einsatzgruppe I against hundreds of Jews who lived in the city. In total, over 500 Jews were murdered in and around the city and the vast majority of the city's Jewish population was deported across the San River into the portion of Poland that was occupied by the Soviet Union.

The border between the two invaders ran through the middle of the city along the San River until June 1941. German-occupied left-bank Przemyśl was part of the Kraków District of the General Government. Members of the Einsatzgruppe I co-formed the local German police unit. On 10 November 1939, the Germans carried out mass arrests of Poles in left-bank Przemyśl and the county, as part of the Intelligenzaktion. Arrested Poles were detained in the local German police prison, and then deported to a prison in Kraków, from where they were eventually deported to the Auschwitz concentration camp. The Soviet-occupied right-bank part of the city was incorporated to the Ukrainian SSR in the atmosphere of NKVD terror as thousands of Jews were ordered to be deported. It became part of the newly established Drohobych Oblast. In 1940, the city became an administrative centre of Peremyshl Uyezd with the Peremyshl Fortified District established along the Nazi-Soviet frontier before the German attack against the USSR in 1941.

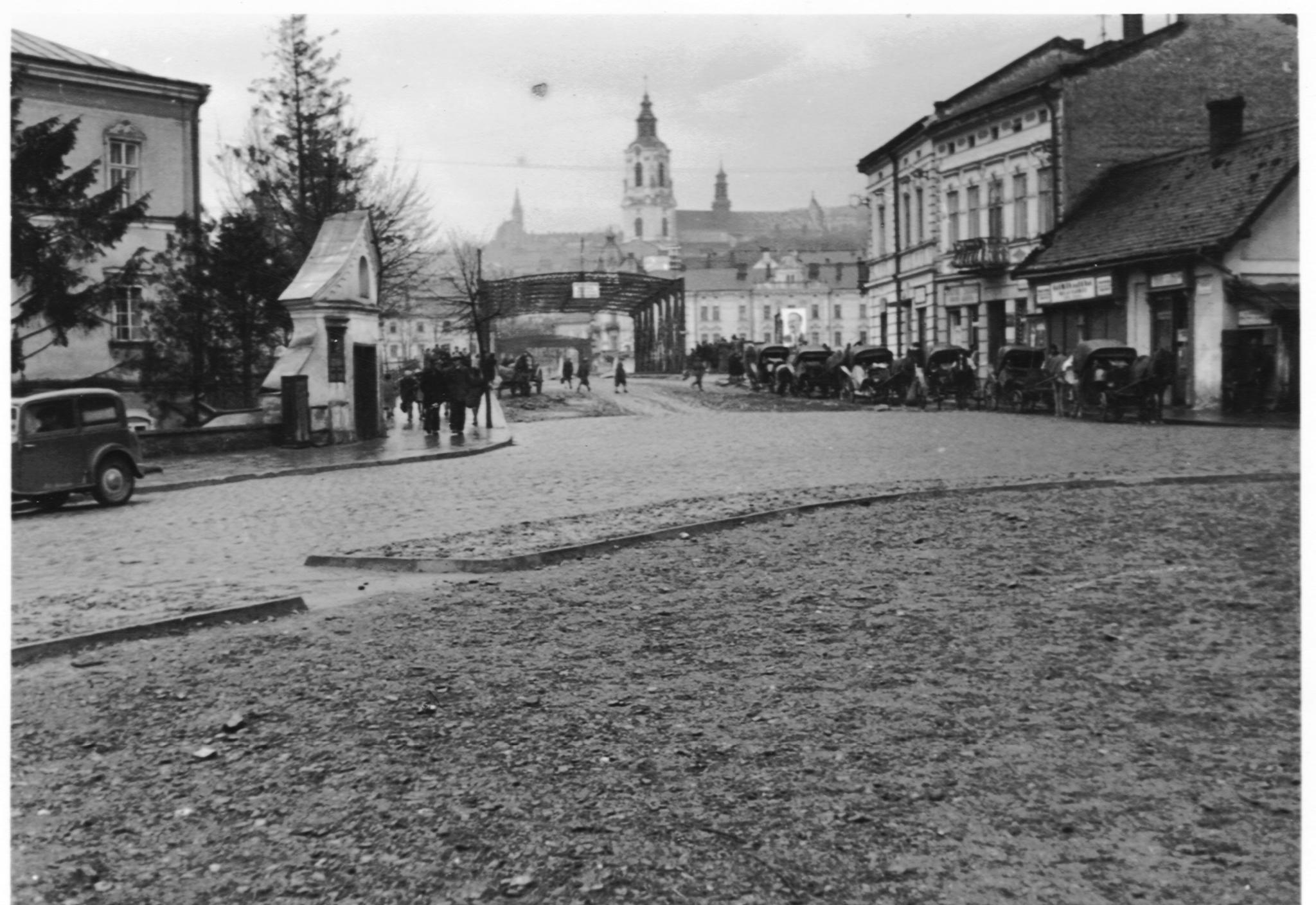
German-occupied left-bank Przemyśl with Soviet-occupied right-bank Przemyśl in the background (World War II)

The town's population increased due to a large influx of Jewish refugees from the General Government who sought to cross the border to Romania. It is estimated that by mid-1941 the Jewish population of the city had grown to roughly 16,500. In the Operation Barbarossa of 1941, the eastern Soviet-occupied part of the city was also occupied by Germany. On 20 June 1942, the first group of 1,000 Jews was transported from the Przemyśl area to the Janowska concentration camp, and on 15 July 1942 a Nazi ghetto was established for all Jewish inhabitants of Przemyśl and its vicinity – some 22,000 people altogether. Local Jews were given 24 hours to enter the ghetto. Jewish communal buildings, including the Tempel Synagogue and the Old Synagogue were destroyed; the New Synagogue, Zasanie Synagogue, and all commercial and residential real estate belonging to Jews were expropriated.

The ghetto in Przemyśl was sealed off from the outside on 14 July 1942. By that time, there may have been as many as 24,000 Jews in the ghetto. On 27 July the Gestapo notified Judenrat about the forced resettlement program and posted notices that an "Aktion" (roundup for deportation to camps) was to be implemented involving almost all occupants. Exceptions were made for some essential, and Gestapo workers, who would have their papers stamped accordingly. On the same day, Major Max Liedtke, military commander of Przemyśl, ordered his troops to seize the bridge across the San river that connected the divided city, and halt the evacuation. The Gestapo were forced to give him permission to retain the workers performing service for the Wehrmacht (up to 100 Jews with families). For the actions undertaken by Liedtke and his adjutant Albert Battel in Przemyśl, Yad Vashem later named them "Righteous Among the Nations". The process of extermination of the Jews resumed thereafter. Until September 1943 almost all Jews were sent to the Auschwitz or Belzec extermination camps. The local branches of the Polish underground and the Żegota managed to save 415 Jews. According to a postwar investigation in German archives, 568 Poles were executed by the Germans for sheltering Jews in the area of Przemyśl, including Michał Kruk, hanged along with several others on 6 September 1943 in a public execution. Among the many Polish rescuers there, were the Banasiewicz, Kurpiel, Kuszek, Lewandowski, and Podgórski families.

In October 1941, the Germans relocated the Stalag II F prisoner-of-war camp from Czarne to Przemyśl and renamed it Stalag 315, with some POWs, including Jews and Soviet communist political commissars, executed by the Sicherheitsdienst. In November 1942, the camp was moved to Villingen. Then in December 1942, the occupiers relocated the Stalag 327 prisoner-of-war camp from Sanok to Przemyśl with multiple subcamps founded in the area. It housed Italian, Dutch and Soviet POWs, with the Italians and Soviets suffering from malnutrition and infectious diseases, and Italians also subjected to mass executions by the Gestapo and SS. In July 1944, the camp was evacuated westwards in a death march with death rates reaching 50 men per day.

The Red Army took the town from German forces on 27 July 1944. On 16 August 1945, a border agreement between the government of the Soviet Union and the Polish Provisional Government of National Unity, installed by the Soviets, was signed in Moscow. According to the so-called Curzon Line, the postwar eastern border of Poland was established several kilometres to the east of Przemyśl.

=== Post-war communism to present ===
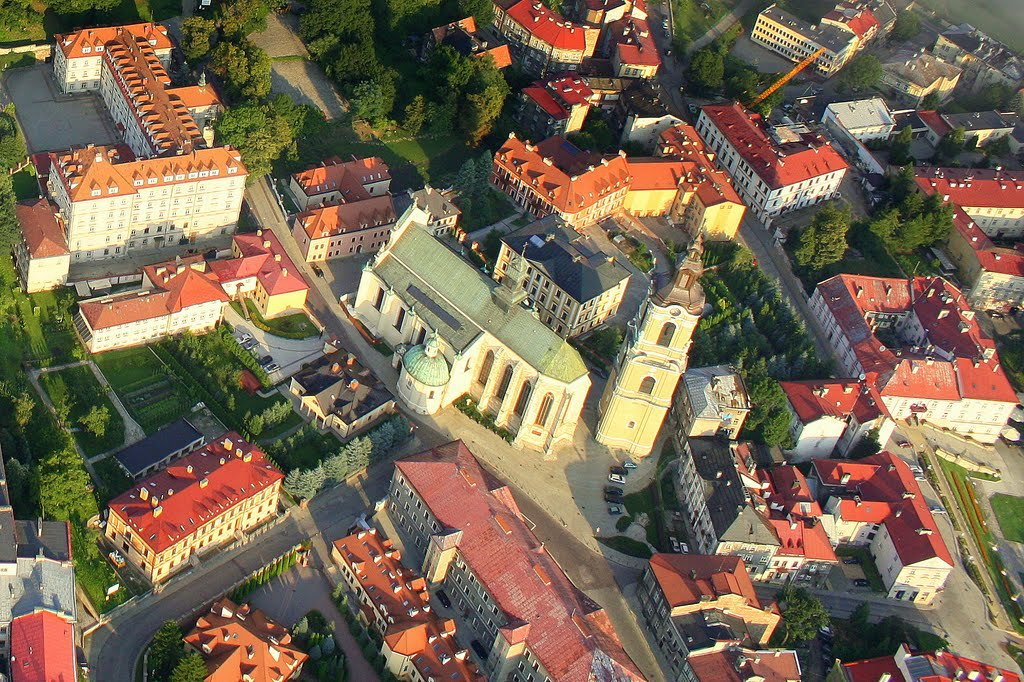
Aerial view of the Przemyśl Cathedral in 2012

In the postwar period, the border ran only 15 kilometres to the east of the city, cutting it off from much of its economic hinterland. Due to the killing of Jews in the Nazi Holocaust and the postwar expulsion of Ukrainians (in the Operation Vistula or akcja Wisła), the city's population fell to 36,000, almost entirely Polish. However, the city welcomed thousands of Polish migrants from Kresy (Eastern Borderlands) who were expelled by the Soviets — their numbers restored the population of the city to its prewar level. On 11 July 2022, President of Ukraine Volodymyr Zelenskyy conferred the honorary title of "Rescuer City" upon Przemyśl for the role the city played in helping Ukrainian refugees fleeing the 2022 Russian invasion of Ukraine.

== Climate ==
The climate is warm-summer humid continental (Köppen: Dfb). Despite its location in southeastern Poland, its winters may be colder than at higher latitudes, especially in the north-west of the country due to continentality.

Climate data for Przemyśl (1971–2000 normals, extremes 1954–2001)
Month	Jan	Feb	Mar	Apr	May	Jun	Jul	Aug	Sep	Oct	Nov	Dec	Year
Record high °C (°F)	14.4 (57.9)	18.5 (65.3)	24.0 (75.2)	29.4 (84.9)	31.5 (88.7)	33.2 (91.8)	34.0 (93.2)	33.8 (92.8)	30.7 (87.3)	27.0 (80.6)	21.8 (71.2)	17.9 (64.2)	34.0 (93.2)
Mean maximum °C (°F)	8.7 (47.7)	10.1 (50.2)	17.1 (62.8)	21.9 (71.4)	26.0 (78.8)	28.3 (82.9)	29.6 (85.3)	29.5 (85.1)	25.9 (78.6)	21.8 (71.2)	14.8 (58.6)	9.7 (49.5)	30.5 (86.9)
Mean daily maximum °C (°F)	0.3 (32.5)	1.8 (35.2)	6.8 (44.2)	12.9 (55.2)	18.6 (65.5)	21.3 (70.3)	22.9 (73.2)	22.6 (72.7)	18.1 (64.6)	12.5 (54.5)	5.6 (42.1)	1.7 (35.1)	12.1 (53.8)
Daily mean °C (°F)	−2.5 (27.5)	−1.4 (29.5)	2.7 (36.9)	8.1 (46.6)	13.5 (56.3)	16.3 (61.3)	18.0 (64.4)	17.4 (63.3)	13.3 (55.9)	8.3 (46.9)	2.6 (36.7)	−0.8 (30.6)	7.9 (46.2)
Mean daily minimum °C (°F)	−5.1 (22.8)	−4.0 (24.8)	−0.7 (30.7)	3.8 (38.8)	8.5 (47.3)	11.6 (52.9)	13.3 (55.9)	12.6 (54.7)	9.4 (48.9)	4.9 (40.8)	0.1 (32.2)	−3.2 (26.2)	4.2 (39.6)
Mean minimum °C (°F)	−15.6 (3.9)	−13.2 (8.2)	−8.4 (16.9)	−2.3 (27.9)	1.7 (35.1)	6.2 (43.2)	8.9 (48.0)	7.1 (44.8)	2.7 (36.9)	−2.6 (27.3)	−7.6 (18.3)	−14.3 (6.3)	−19.0 (−2.2)
Record low °C (°F)	−30.0 (−22.0)	−30.4 (−22.7)	−26.1 (−15.0)	−5.7 (21.7)	−2.4 (27.7)	1.4 (34.5)	5.0 (41.0)	2.3 (36.1)	−3.2 (26.2)	−6.9 (19.6)	−21.0 (−5.8)	−25.6 (−14.1)	−30.4 (−22.7)
Average precipitation mm (inches)	26.8 (1.06)	27.6 (1.09)	31.3 (1.23)	51.9 (2.04)	75.6 (2.98)	88.8 (3.50)	94.9 (3.74)	68.9 (2.71)	68.3 (2.69)	50.9 (2.00)	38.3 (1.51)	38.9 (1.53)	658.8 (25.94)
Average precipitation days (≥ 0.1 mm)	14.9	14.0	14.2	13.3	14.2	15.2	13.8	12.3	12.6	13.7	15.0	17.0	170.1
Average relative humidity (%)	82.3	82.3	77.0	72.8	75.3	76.5	76.6	78.1	80.2	81.4	83.1	84.4	79.2
Mean monthly sunshine hours	49.2	64.8	107.9	143.7	210.5	214.7	233.2	220.6	138.5	96.0	51.3	36.4	1,558.6
Source: Meteomodel.pl (humidity 1961-1990)

Climate data for Przemyśl (Podwinie), elevation: 279 m or 915 ft, 1961–1990 normals and extremes
Month	Jan	Feb	Mar	Apr	May	Jun	Jul	Aug	Sep	Oct	Nov	Dec	Year
Record high °C (°F)	13.6 (56.5)	18.5 (65.3)	24.0 (75.2)	29.4 (84.9)	30.2 (86.4)	33.2 (91.8)	33.2 (91.8)	33.5 (92.3)	30.0 (86.0)	27.0 (80.6)	21.8 (71.2)	17.9 (64.2)	33.5 (92.3)
Mean daily maximum °C (°F)	−0.6 (30.9)	1.2 (34.2)	6.3 (43.3)	13.1 (55.6)	18.5 (65.3)	21.2 (70.2)	22.7 (72.9)	22.4 (72.3)	18.5 (65.3)	13.2 (55.8)	6.4 (43.5)	1.5 (34.7)	12.0 (53.7)
Daily mean °C (°F)	−3.5 (25.7)	−2.0 (28.4)	2.2 (36.0)	8.1 (46.6)	13.3 (55.9)	16.3 (61.3)	17.6 (63.7)	17.0 (62.6)	13.5 (56.3)	8.7 (47.7)	3.5 (38.3)	−1.0 (30.2)	7.8 (46.1)
Mean daily minimum °C (°F)	−6.4 (20.5)	−4.8 (23.4)	−1.1 (30.0)	3.7 (38.7)	8.3 (46.9)	11.4 (52.5)	13.0 (55.4)	12.4 (54.3)	9.4 (48.9)	5.0 (41.0)	0.8 (33.4)	−3.5 (25.7)	4.0 (39.2)
Record low °C (°F)	−30.0 (−22.0)	−30.4 (−22.7)	−26.1 (−15.0)	−5.7 (21.7)	−2.4 (27.7)	1.4 (34.5)	5.0 (41.0)	2.3 (36.1)	−3.2 (26.2)	−6.8 (19.8)	−21.0 (−5.8)	−25.5 (−13.9)	−30.4 (−22.7)
Average precipitation mm (inches)	29 (1.1)	29 (1.1)	34 (1.3)	48 (1.9)	76 (3.0)	97 (3.8)	100 (3.9)	77 (3.0)	55 (2.2)	42 (1.7)	40 (1.6)	40 (1.6)	667 (26.2)
Average precipitation days (≥ 1.0 mm)	7.2	6.8	7.1	8.2	10.7	11.2	11.2	9.4	8.1	7.1	8.3	8.4	103.7
Source: NOAA

== Transport ==
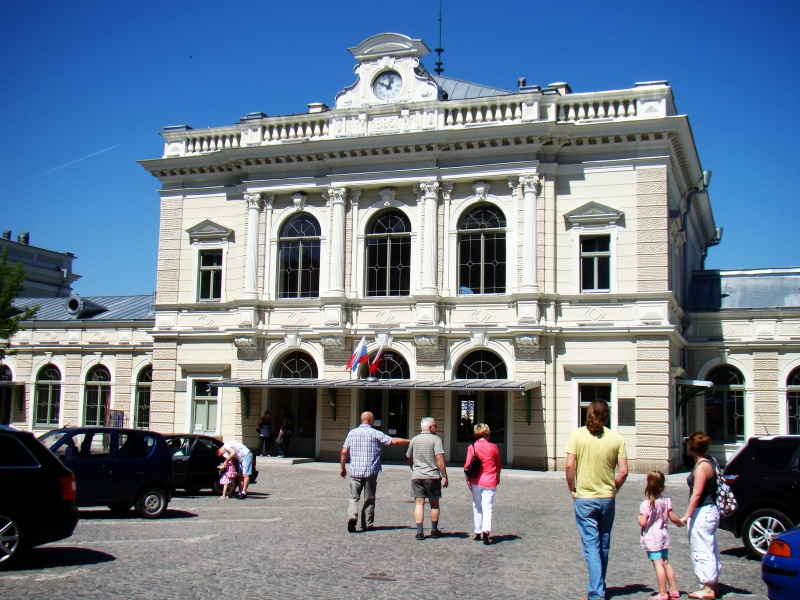
Przemyśl Główny railway station

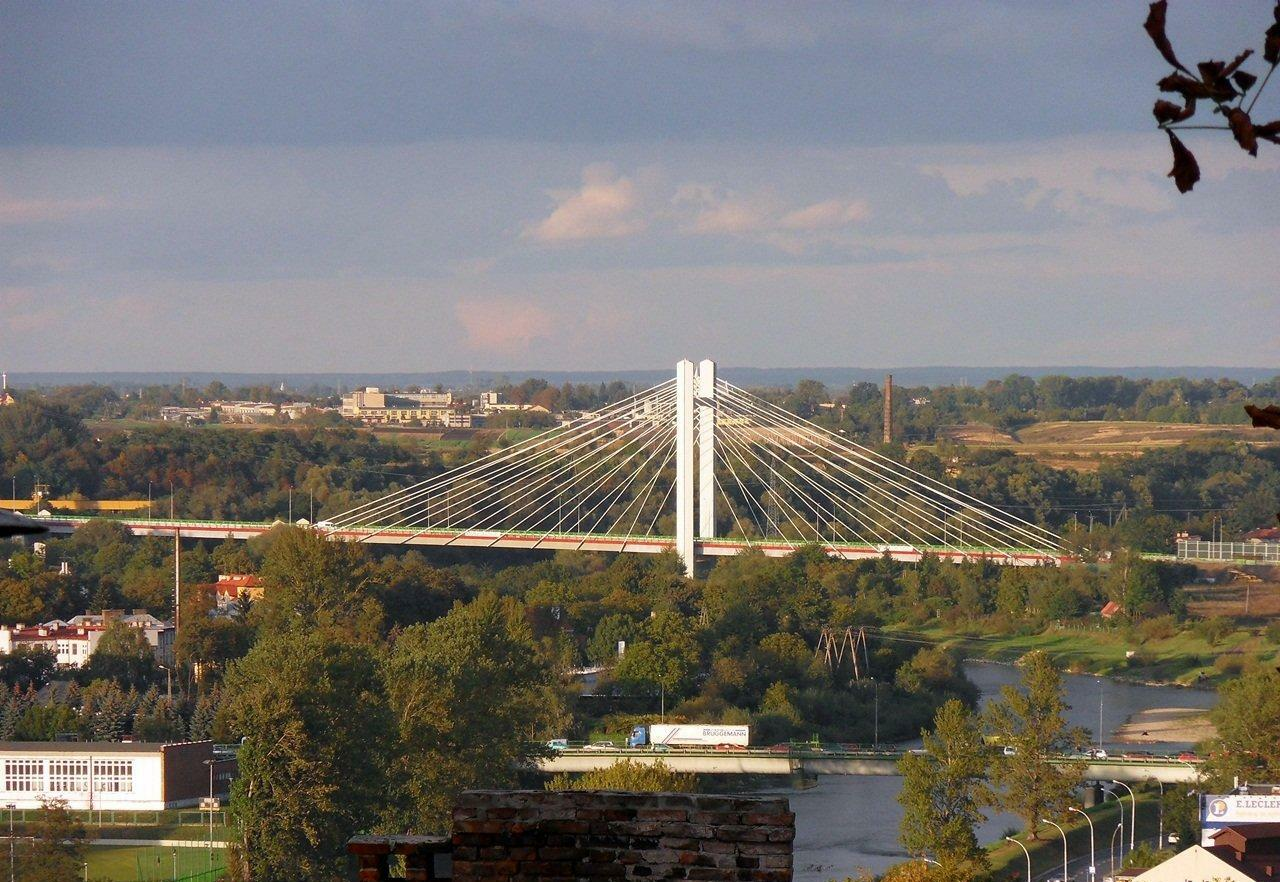
Brama Przemyska Bridge

The main Przemyśl railway station is called Przemyśl Główny, and is located in the city center. About 40 trains depart every day, including trains to many cities in Poland, as well as in Germany, Austria, the Czech Republic and Ukraine.

The main road connection to the rest of Poland is provided by the A4 motorway that passes about 15 km (9 mi) north of the city center.

The closest international airport is Rzeszów–Jasionka, about 90 km (56 mi) away by road.

== Main sights ==
Due to the long and rich history of the city, there are many sights in and around Przemyśl, of special interest to tourists, including the Old Town, which is listed as a Historic Monument of Poland, with the Rynek, the main market square.

Among the historic buildings and museums, opened to visitors, are:

- Old Town Market Square
- The Great Przemyśl Cathedral
- Muzeum Diecezjalne (the diocesan museum)
- Przemyśl Castle, built by Casimir III the Great in the 14th century
- Carmelite Church, 17th century late-Renaissance church
- Cathedral of St. John the Baptist, Przemyśl, former 17th-century Jesuit church, now a Ukrainian Greek Catholic cathedral
- Reformed Franciscan church and monastery, founded in 1627
- Franciscan Church, from mid-18th-century in a baroque style
- Lubomirski Palace, an eclectic style palace of the Lubomirski family constructed in 1885
- Przemyśl Główny train station built in 1895
- Zasanie Synagogue
- New Synagogue, built in 1918
- Salesians Church, built 1912-23 in Gothic Revival style
- Muzeum Narodowe (the National Museum), contains a collection of icons, second only to the one in Sanok in size
- Muzeum Dzwonów i Fajek (the Museum of Bells and Pipes)
- Kopiec Tatarski, a mound to the south of the city where a 16th-century Tatar khan was supposedly buried. The Tatarska Góra TV tower is built on the mound.
- Przemyśl Fortress, a Historic Monument of Poland
- World War I cemeteries (Cmentarz Wojskowy)
- Civil Defense Shelter – Schron Kierowania Obroną Cywilną
- Railway bridge designed by Gustave Eiffel
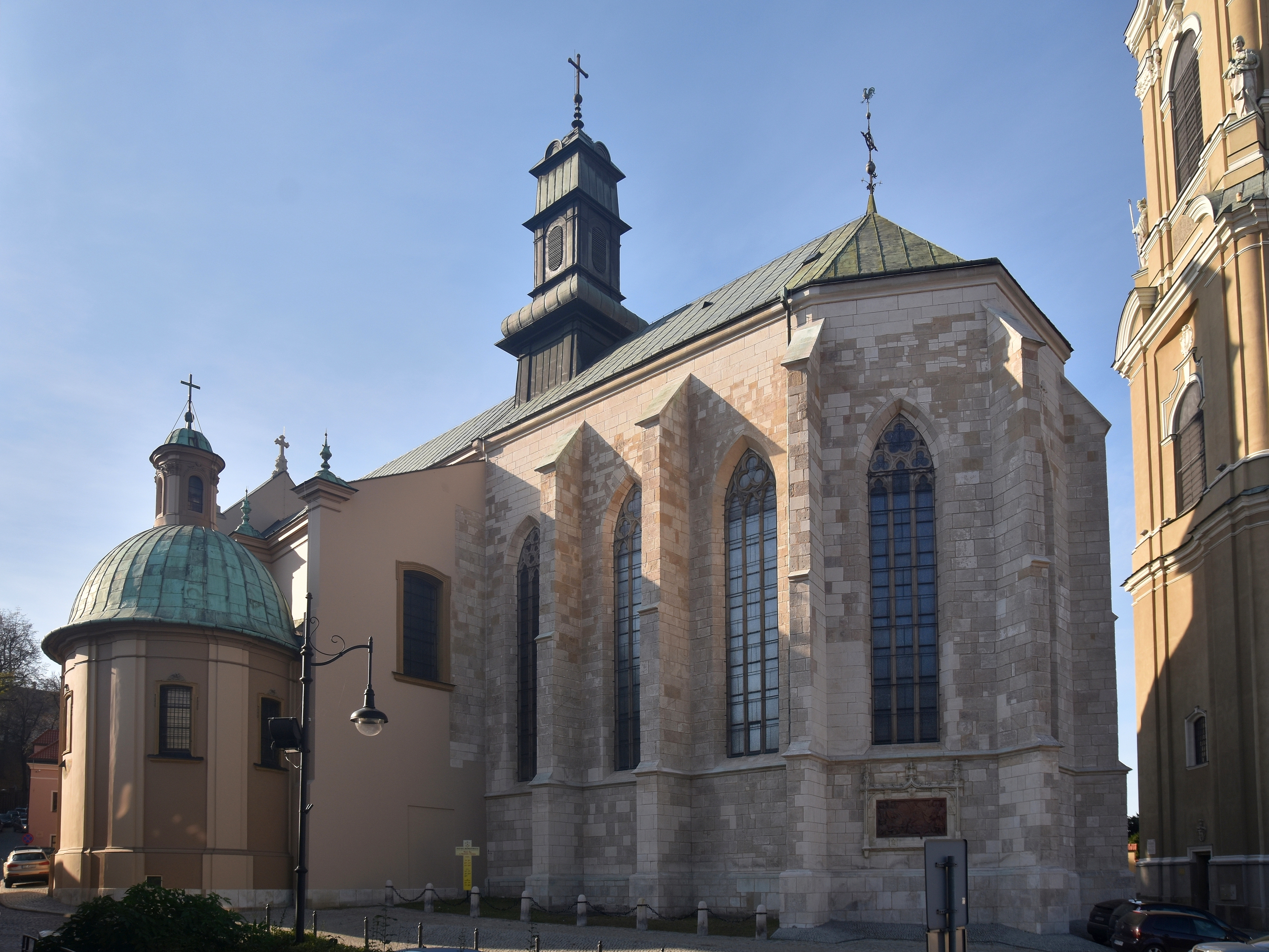
Cathedral of Przemyśl

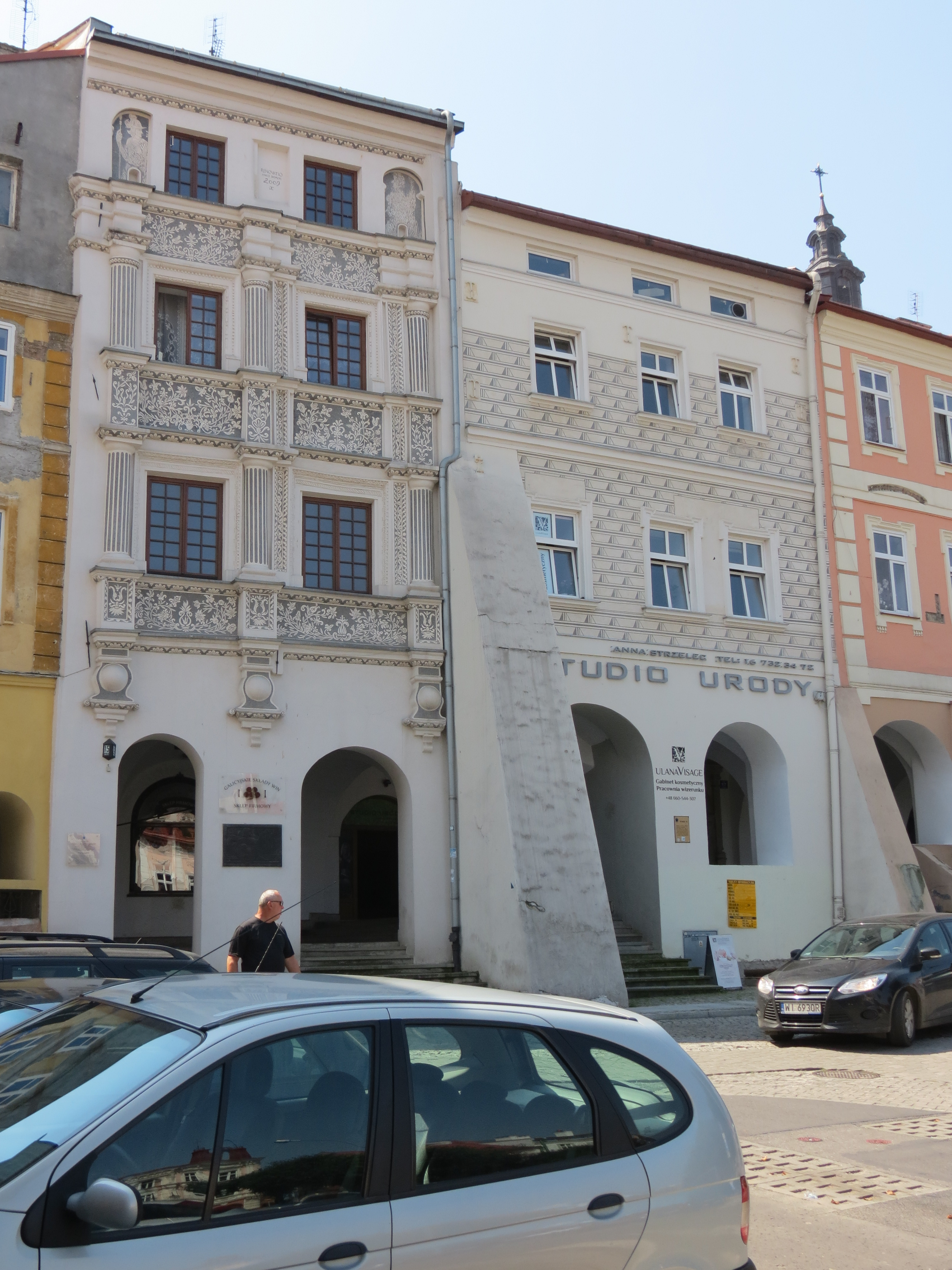
Renaissance houses on the Old Town Market Square

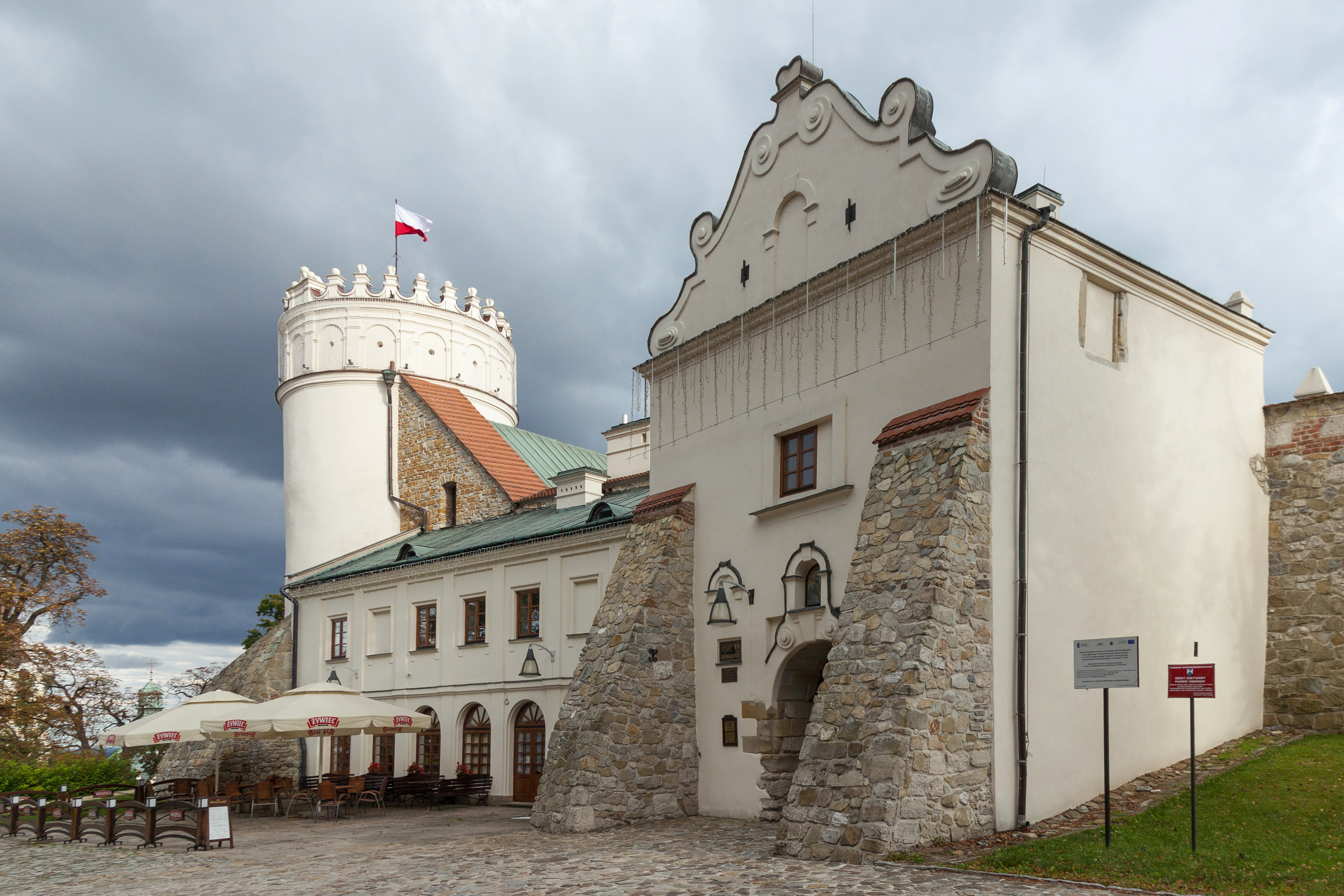
The northern wing of the Przemyśl Castle

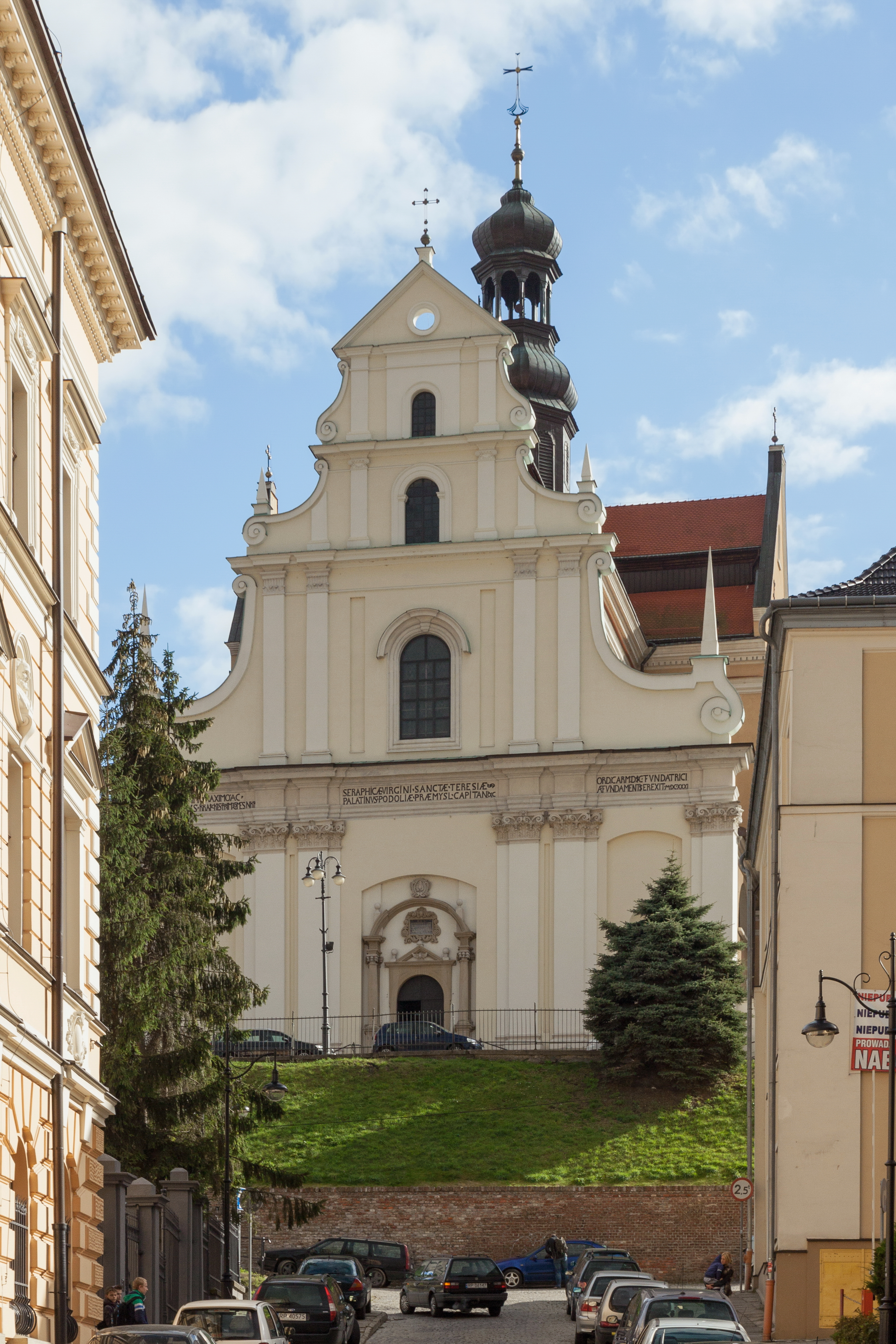
Carmelite Church of Saint Theresa

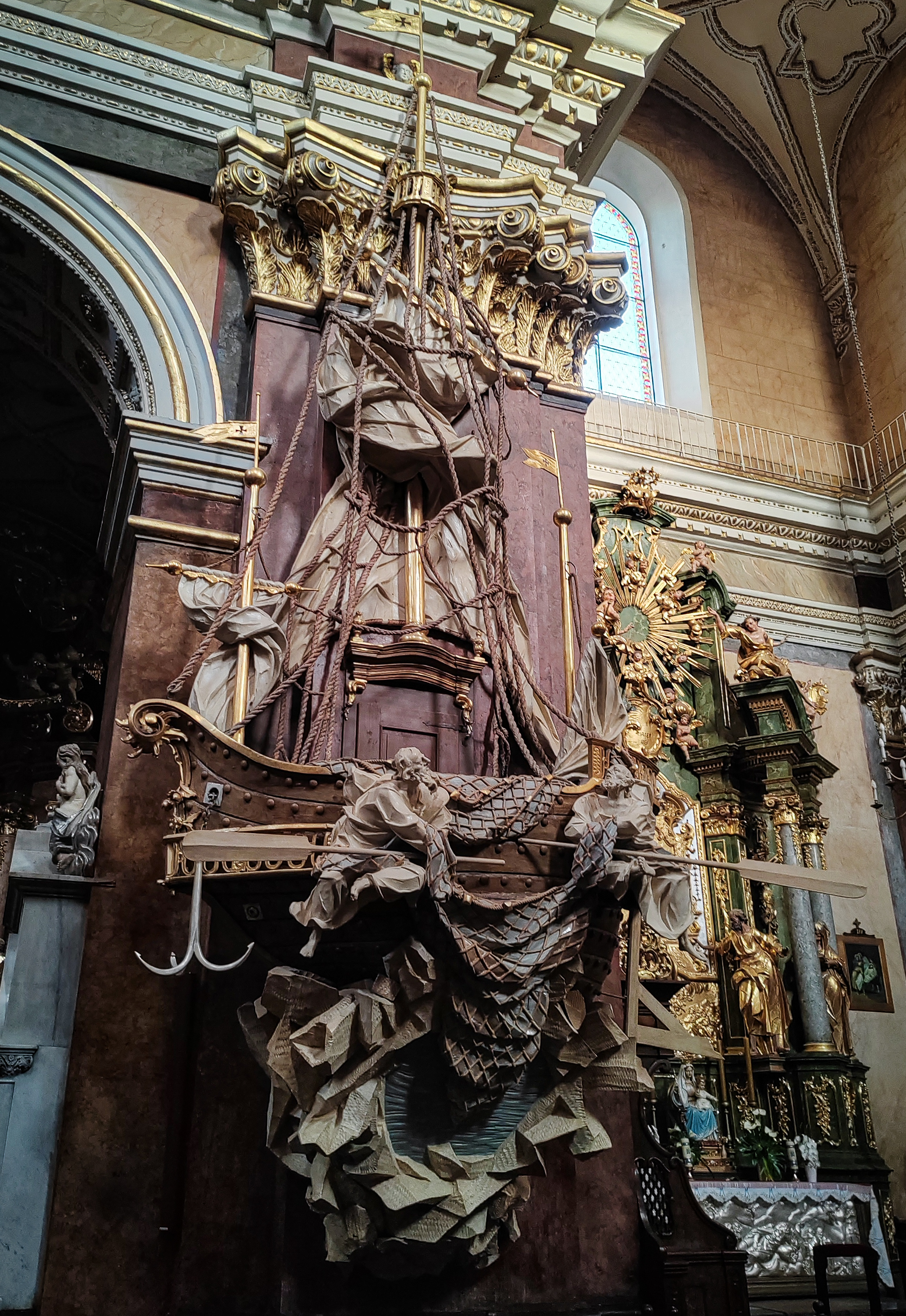
Ship-shaped pulpit in the Carmelite Church

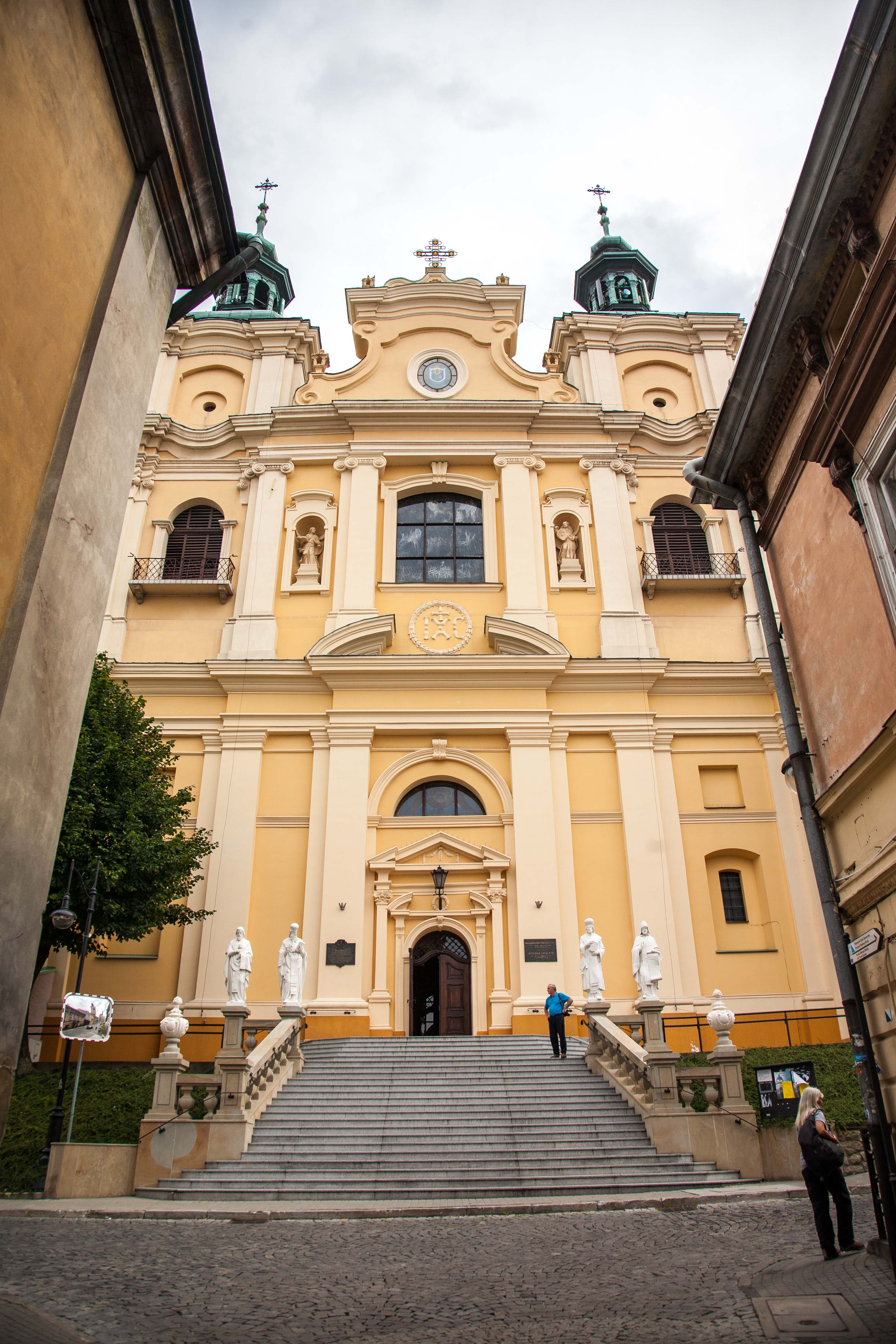
Greek Catholic Cathedral of St. John the Baptist, former Jesuit church

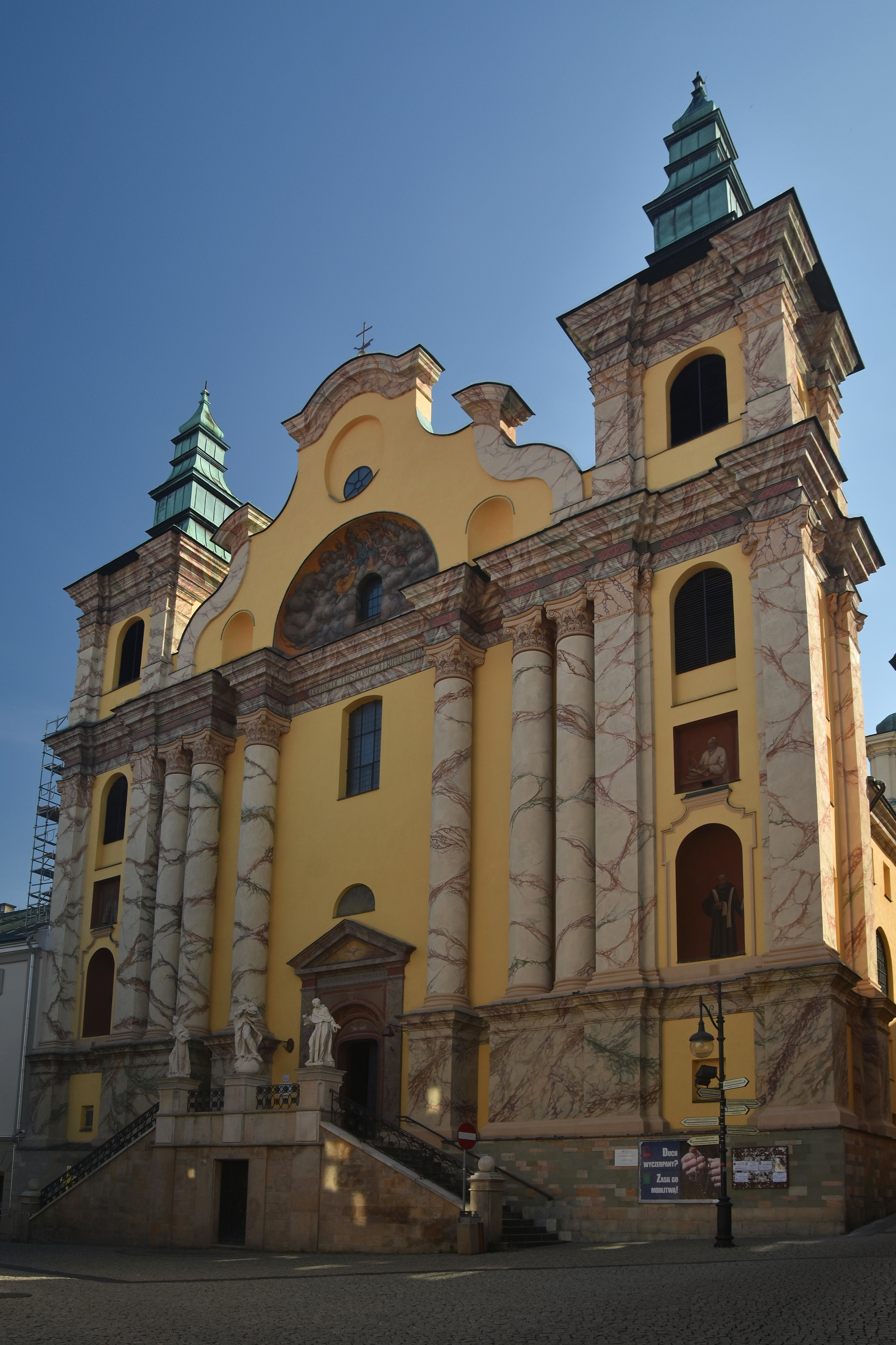
Franciscan Church of Saint Mary Magdalene

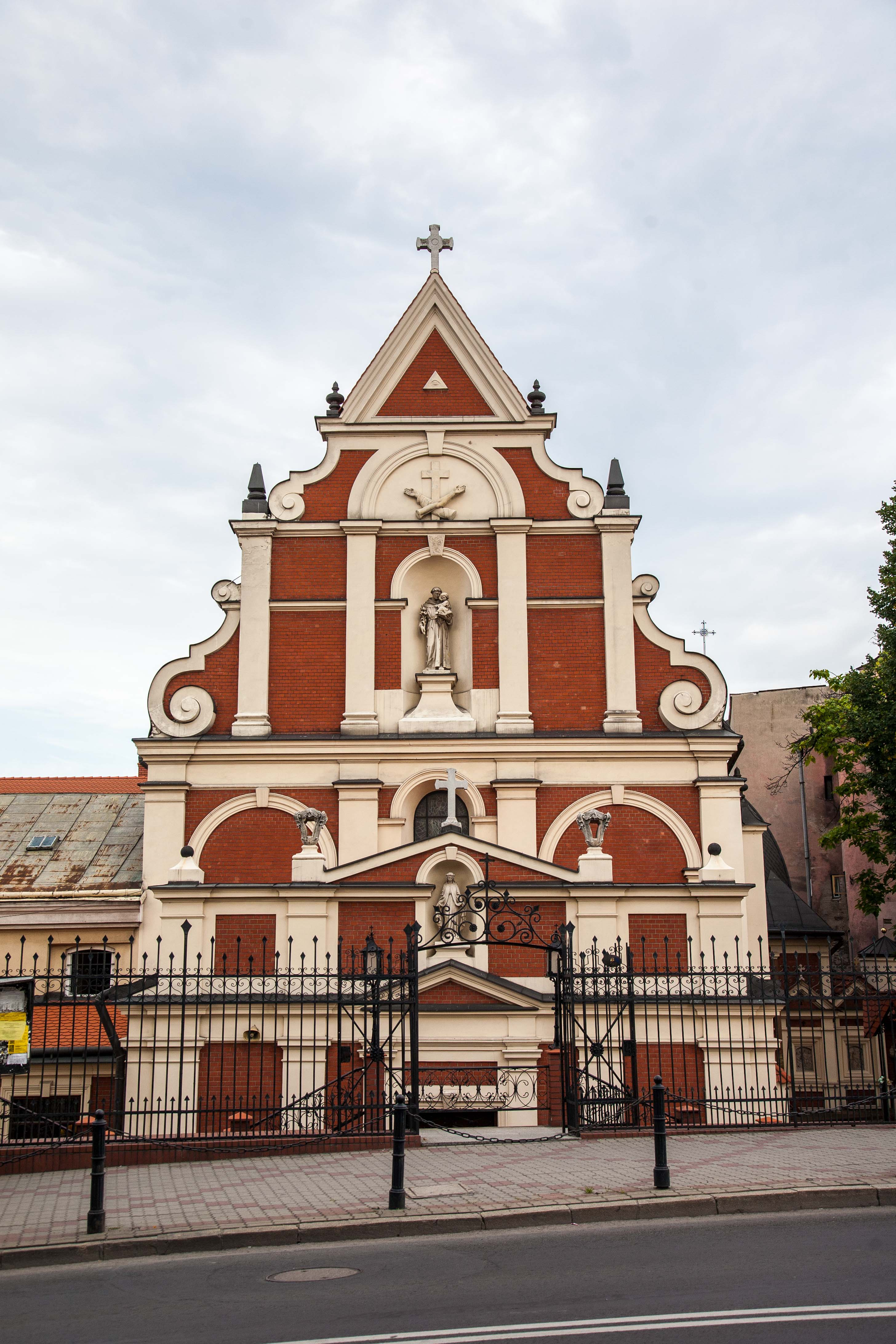
Saint Anthony church

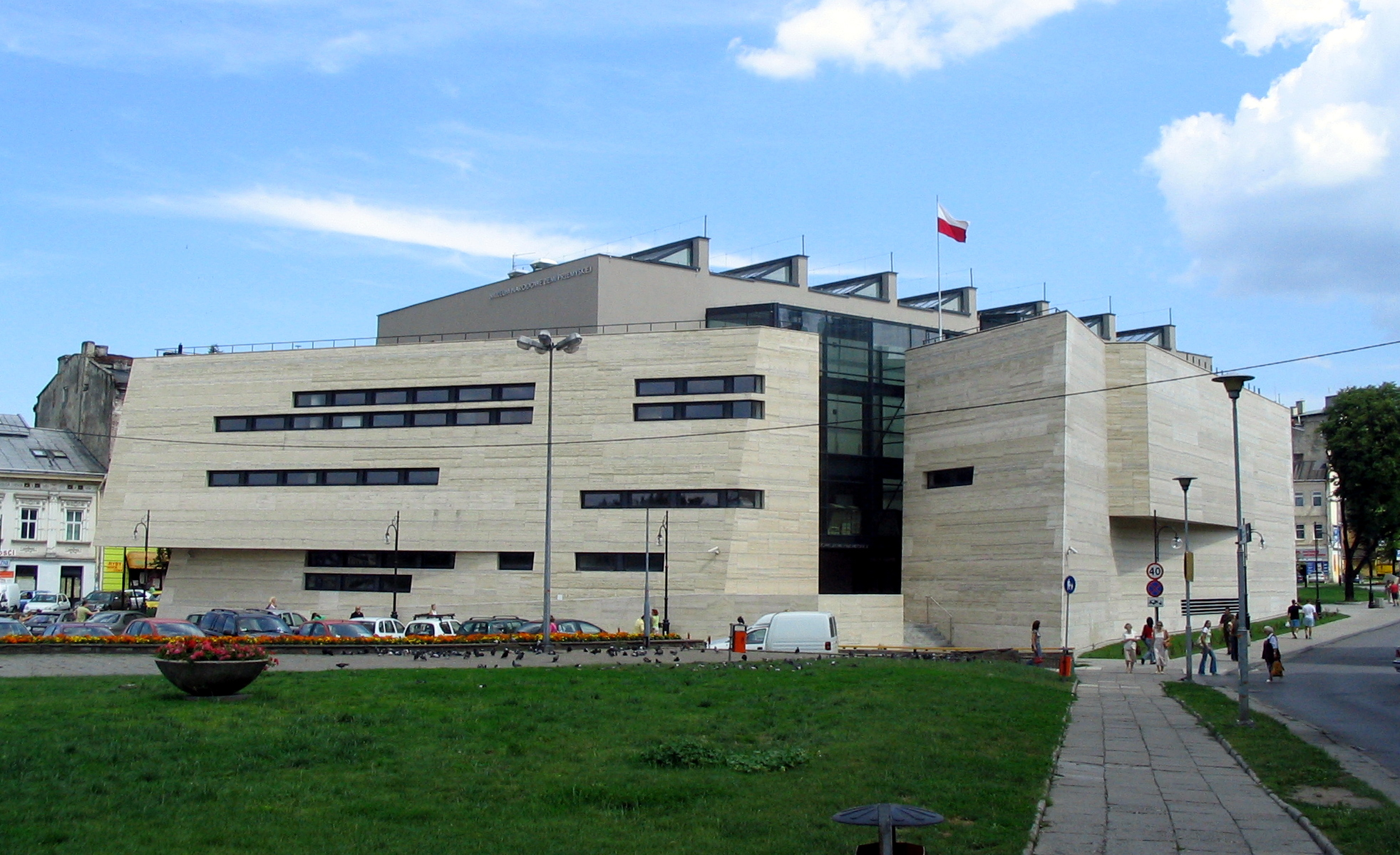
National Museum in Przemyśl

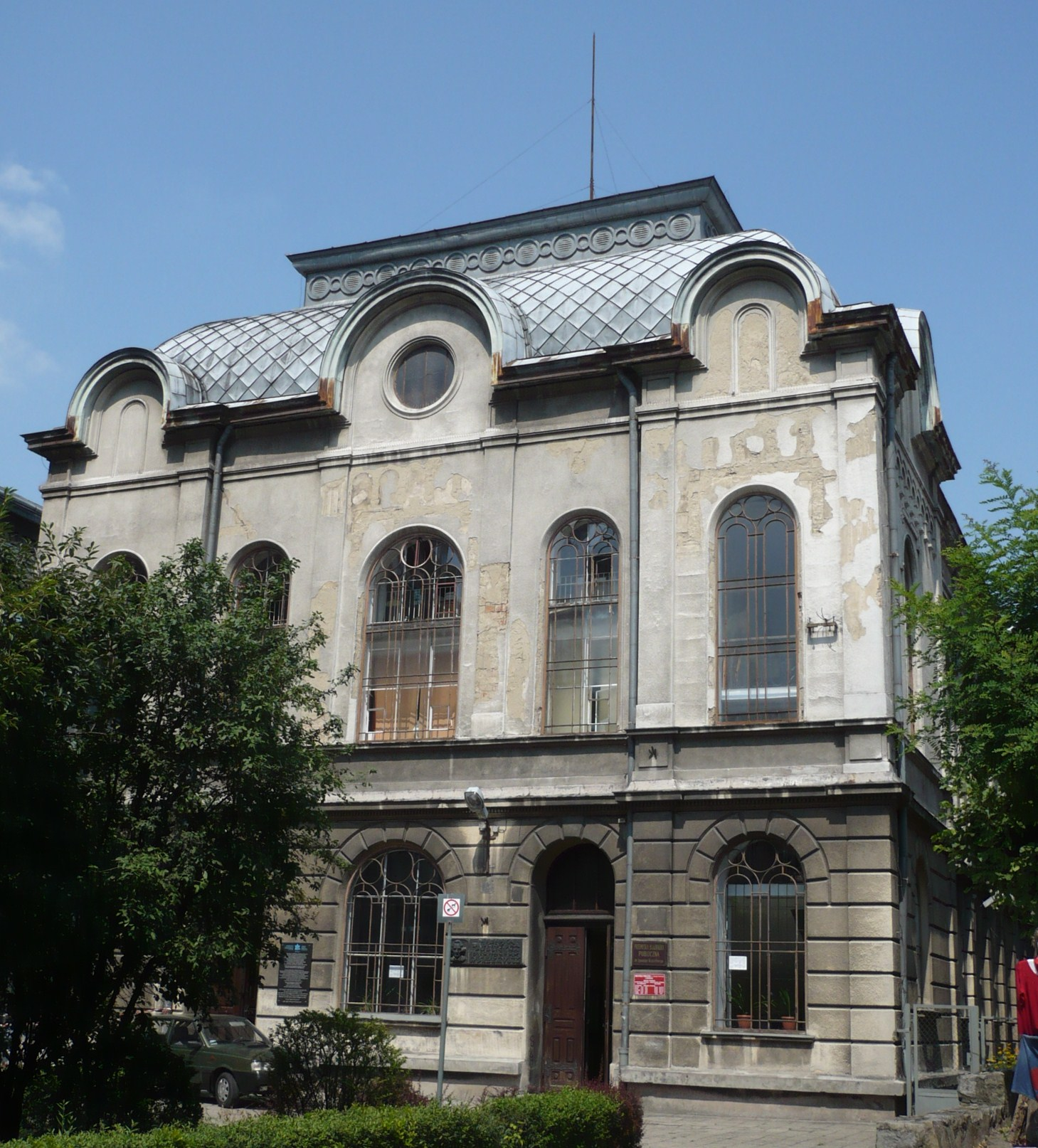
New Synagogue

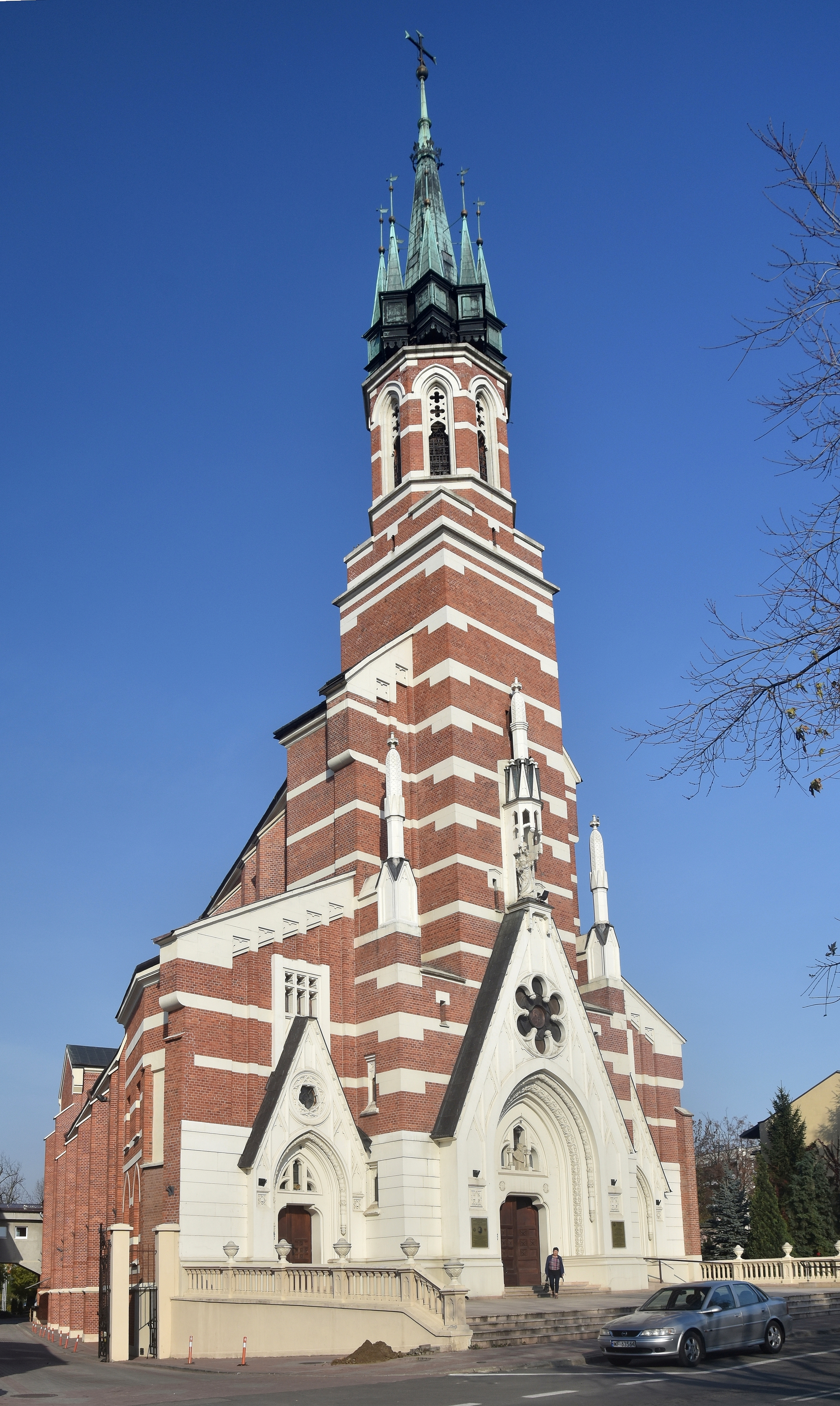
Salesian church

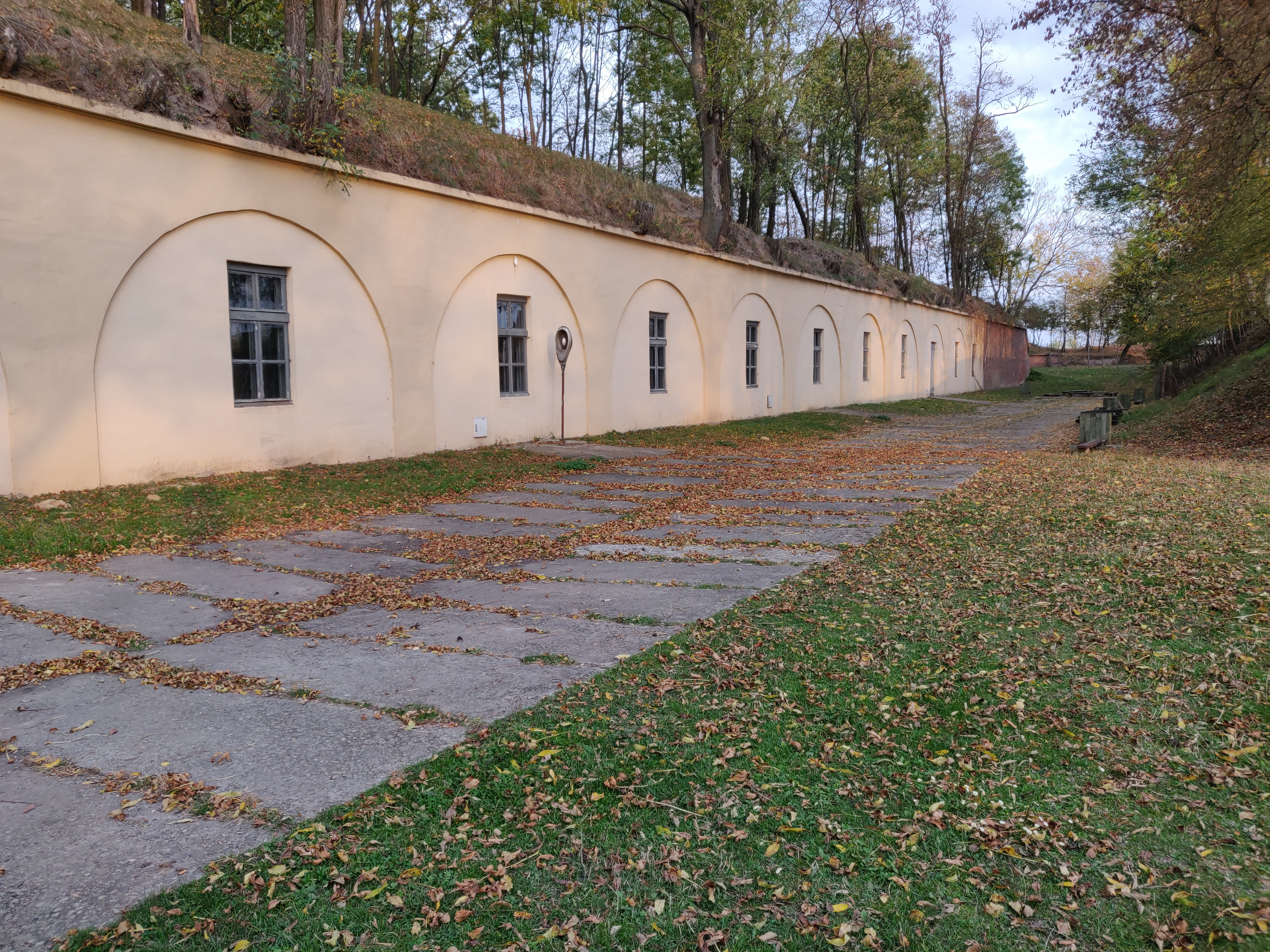
Fort W XII „Werner” (today museum) near Przemyśl

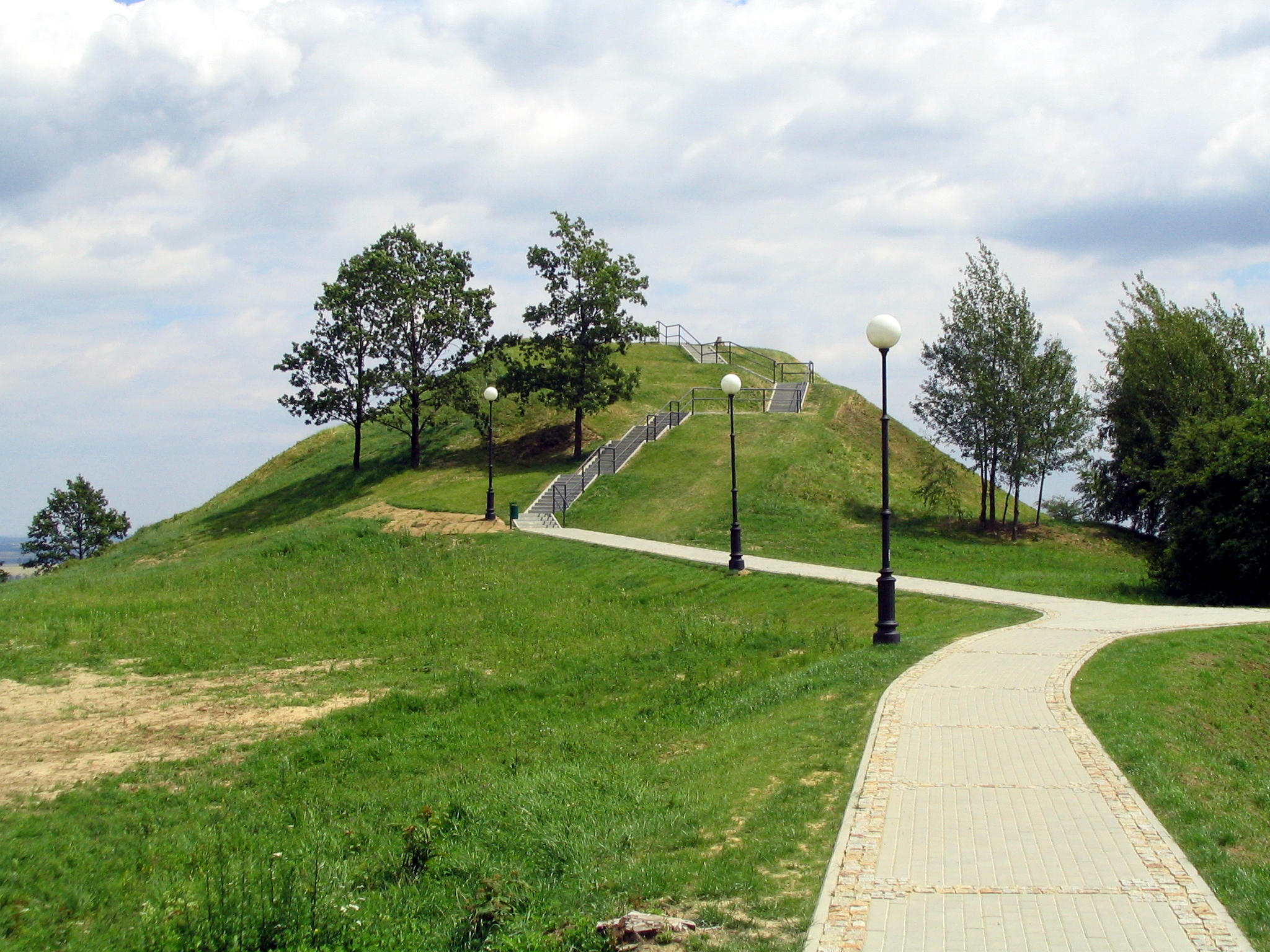
Tatar mound

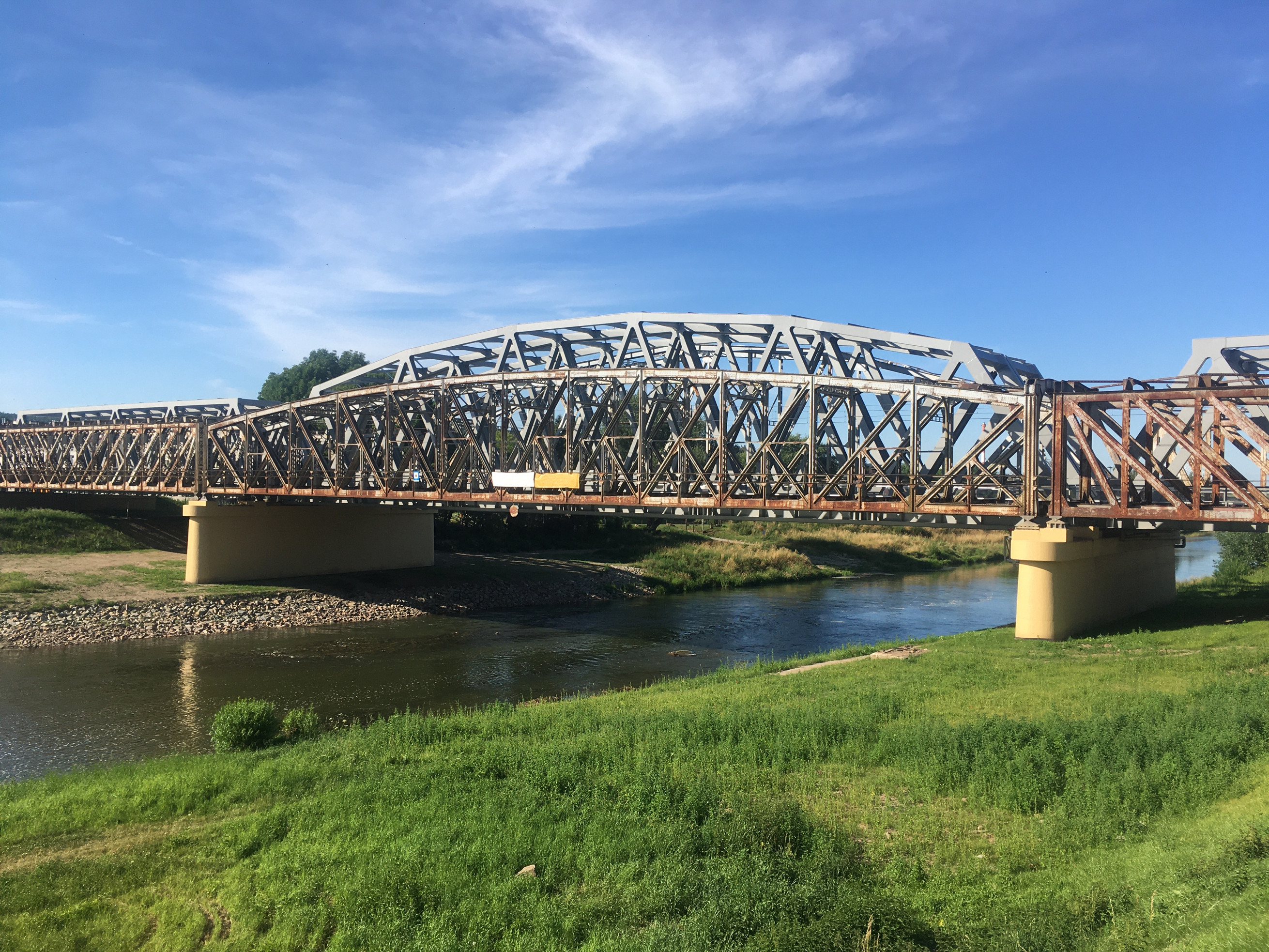
Railway bridge

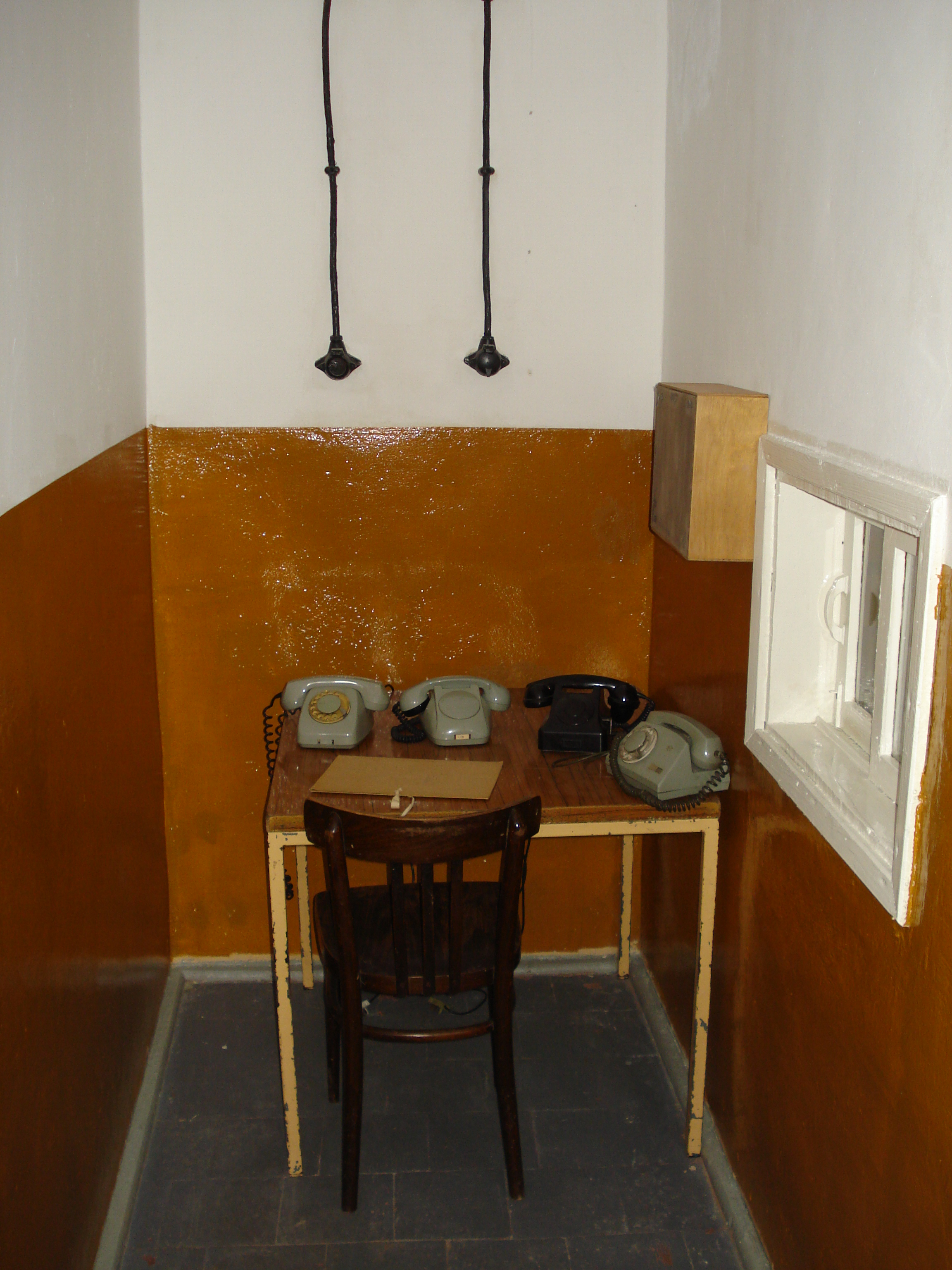
Civil defence shelter

== Education ==
- Wyższa Szkoła Administracji i Zarządzania
  - Wydział zamiejscowy w Rzeszowie
- Wyższa Szkoła Gospodarcza
- Wyższa Szkoła Informatyki i Zarządzania
- Nauczycielskie Kolegium Języków Obcych
- Nauczycielskie Kolegium Języka Polskiego

== Sport ==
- Czuwaj Przemyśl – football club
- AZS Czuwaj Przemyśl – handball club
- Polonia Przemyśl – football club

== Politics ==
=== Krosno/Przemyśl constituency (2023 elections) ===
Members of Sejm elected from Krosno/Przemyśl constituency

==== Law and Justice ====
- Marek Kuchciński
- Anna Schmidt
- Piotr Uruski (SP)
- Piotr Babinetz
- Teresa Pamuła
- Tadeusz Chrzan
- Maria Kurowska (SP)

==== Civic Coalition ====
- Joanna Frydrych (PO)
- Marek Rząsa (PO)

==== Third Way ====
- Bartosz Romowicz (PL2050)

==== Confederation ====
- Andrzej Zapałowski

== Twin towns ==
Przemyśl is twinned with:

- Chivasso, Italy
- Eger, Hungary
- Kamianets-Podilskyi, Ukraine
- Lviv, Ukraine
- Paderborn, Germany
- South Kesteven, United Kingdom
- Truskavets, Ukraine

== Notable people ==
- Jerzy Bartmiński (1939–2022), Polish linguist and ethnologist, lecturer at the UMCS
- Avraham Ben-Yitzhak (1883–1950), Israeli poet
- Ben Bernanke (born 1953), American economist
- Svetozar Boroević (1856–1920), Austro-Hungarian Army Marshal
- Jan Borukowski, Bishop of Przemyśl (1524–1584)
- Helene Deutsch, née Rosenbach (1884–1982), Polish-American psychoanalyst
- Karl Duldig (1902–1986), Austrian-Australian sculptor
- Andrzej Maksymilian Fredro (c. 1620–1679), Sejm Marshal
- Mark Gertler (1891–1939), British painter
- Leonid Gobyato (1875–1915), Russian military designer
- Stefan Grabiński (1887–1936), Polish writer
- Giulietta Guicciardi (1782–1856), Austrian countess
- Joshua Höschel ben Joseph (1578–1648), Polish rabbi
- Wojciech Inglot (1955–2013), Polish entrepreneur, founder of Inglot Cosmetics Company
- Hermann Kusmanek von Burgneustädten (1860–1934), Colonel-General of the Austrian Imperial Army
- Jacob Mann (1888–1940), American historian
- Czesław Marek (1891–1985) Polish composer, pianist, and piano teacher
- Lidia Morawska (born 1952), physicist
- Yaroslav Osmomysl (c. 1135–1187), Prince of Halych
- Rena Pfiffer-Lax (1893–1943), opera singer
- Jerzy Podbrożny (born 1966), Polish footballer
- Stefania Podgórska (1925–2018), Polish holocaust resister, Righteous Among the Nations
- Jan Nepomucen Potocki (1867–1943), Polish nobleman
- Teodor Andrzej Potocki (1664–1738), Polish nobleman, Primate of Poland
- Hieronim Florian Radziwiłł (1715–1760), Polish–Lithuanian nobleman
- Jaroslav Rudnyckyj (1910–1995), Ukrainian-Canadian linguist
- Pawel Sek (born 1977), Polish music producer and composer
- Ryszard Siwiec (1909–1968), Polish accountant and former Home Army resistance member
- Renia Spiegel (1924–1942), Polish-born Jewish diarist
- Zeev Sternhell (1935–2020), Polish-born Israeli historian, political scientist and commentator
- Andrzej Trzebicki (1607–1679), Polish nobleman, bishop of Kraków
- Anatole Vakhnianyn (1841–1908), Ukrainian political and cultural figure, composer, teacher and journalist
- Jan Wężyk (1575–1638), Polish nobleman, Primate of Poland
- Andrzej Tomasz Zapałowski (born 1966), Polish politician and a former Member of the European Parliament (MEP)
- Władysław Dominik Zasławski (c. 1616–1656), Polish nobleman of Ruthenian origin
- Velvel Zbarjer (1824–1884), Galician Jewish Brody singer
- Samuel Zborowski (?–1584), Polish military commander
- Zyndram of Maszkowice (c. 1355–c. 1414), Polish knight

== See also ==
- Old Synagogue in Przemyśl destroyed by the Nazis in 1941
- Przemyślanin
