= New Synagogue (Przemyśl) =

Former Orthodox synagogue, now library, in Przemyśl, Poland

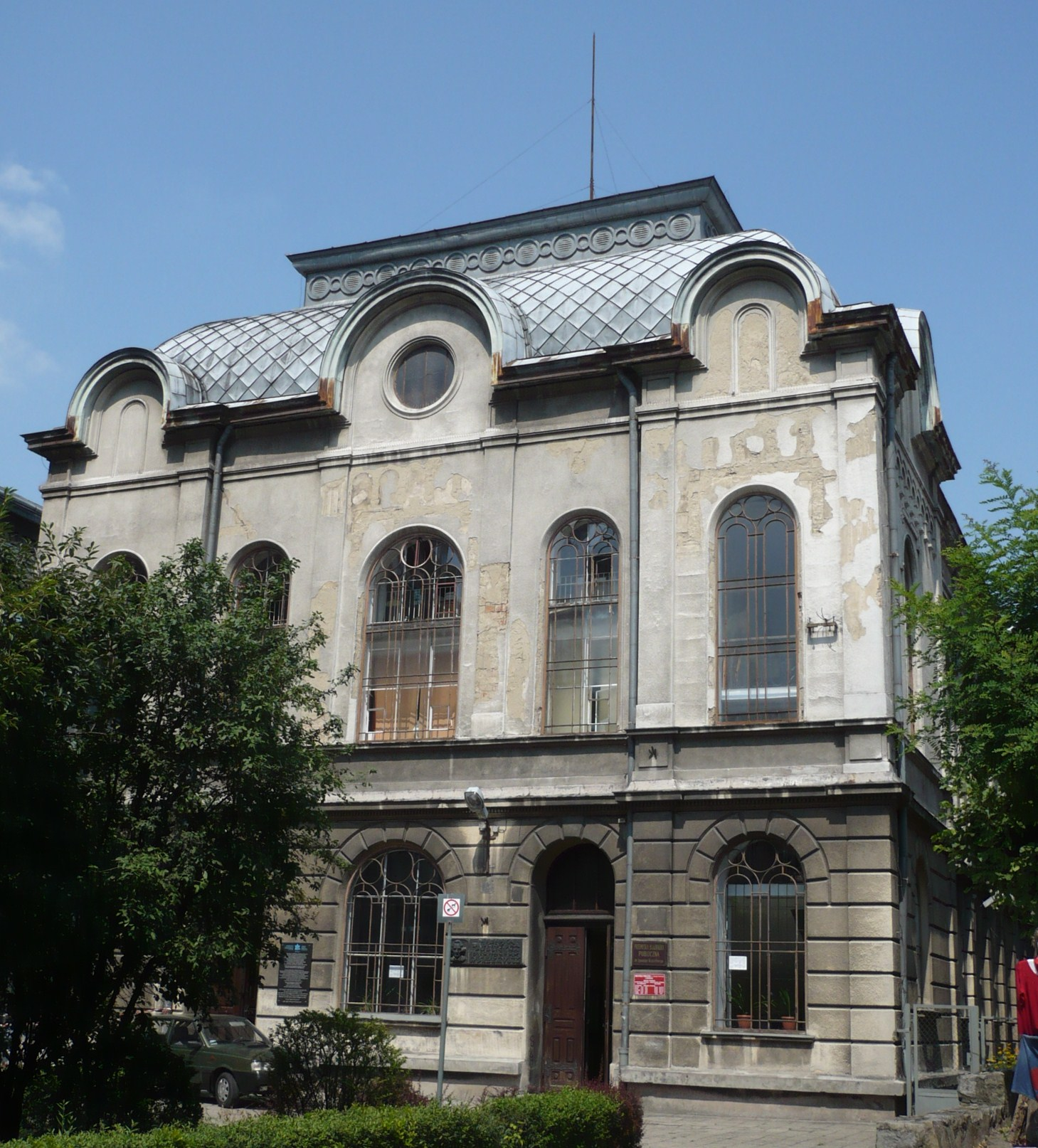
- The former synagogue, now library, in 2010

- Location of the former synagogue in Podkarpackie Voivodeship

Religion
- Affiliation: Orthodox Judaism (former)
- Rite: Nusach Ashkenaz
- Ecclesiastical or organizational status: Synagogue (1918–1939); Profane use (1940s–1960); Library (since 1967)
- Ownership: Congregation of the Jewish Faith in Przemyśl (1918–1968); Ignacy Krasicki Przemyśl Public Library (since 1968)
- Status: Abandoned (as a synagogue); Repurposed

Location
- Location: Juliusza Słowackiego 15, Przemyśl, Podkarpackie Voivodeship
- Country: Poland
- Interactive map of New Synagogue
- Coordinates: 49°46′52″N 22°46′33″E

Architecture
- Architect: Stanisław Majerski
- Type: Synagogue architecture
- Style: Rundbogenstil; Classical Revival; Art Nouveau/Young Poland; Baroque Revival
- Groundbreaking: 1910
- Completed: 1918
- Materials: Brick

The New Synagogue, also called Scheinbach’s Synagogue, is a former Orthodox Jewish congregation and synagogue, located at Juliusza Słowackiego 15, in Przemyśl, in the Podkarpackie Voivodeship of Poland. Designed by Stanisław Majerski and completed in 1918, the synagogue served as a house of prayer until World War II when it was desecrated by Nazis in 1939.

Since 1967, the building has been used as the Ignacy Krasicki Przemyśl Public Library.

== History and architecture ==
Construction on the synagogue began in 1910 and was completed in 1918 after delays caused by the First World War. The spacious, high-ceilinged building survives, although Communist-period renovations stripped so much of the exterior detail that it presents an appearance in marked contrast to the building shown in old photographs.

The synagogue is a free-standing brick building in an eclectic blend of Rundbogenstil and Classical Revival styles with decoration attributed to contain elements of the Baroque Revival style. Designed by Stanisław Majerski, the elaborate interior decoration once featured Biblical scenes and scenes of Eretz Israel painted on the walls and ceiling.

Reincarnated as a public library, the building's interior is sedate and functional, with bookshelves and walls painted white. The synagogue also had a notable set of stained glass windows. The windows and paintings were by Adolf Bienenstock, a Jewish Przemyśl artist who was a graduate of the Jan Matejko Academy of Fine Arts. Kraków, like Przemyśl, was then part of Austrian Galicia (also known as Austrian Poland). Bienenstock, who taught art at the Przemyśl Gymnasium, had studied under the notable Polish artist Józef Mehoffer. The interior reflected the influence of the Young Poland movement of which Mehoffer was part. Young Poland was the Polish version of the jugendstil (Art Nouveau) movement.

The synagogue was used for profane purposes including as a stable by the German army during World War II, and then later as a textile factory under the Communist post-War government, before being turned into a library in 1967.

== See also ==
- History of the Jews in Poland
- List of active synagogues in Poland
