= List of mannerist structures in Southern Poland =

The mannerist architecture and sculpture in Poland includes two major traditions, Polish/Italian and Dutch/Flemish, that dominated in northern Poland. The Silesian mannerism of southwestern Poland was largely influenced by Bohemian and German mannerism, while the Pomeranian mannerism of northwestern Poland was influenced by Gothic tradition and Northern German mannerism. The Jews in Poland adapted patterns of Italian and Polish mannerism to their own tradition. The mannerist complex of Kalwaria Zebrzydowska and mannerist City of Zamość are UNESCO World Heritage Sites.

The Polish mannerism, though largely dominated by Italian architects and sculptors, has unique characteristics which differentiate it from its Italian equivalent, including attics, decorational motives, the construction and shape of buildings, and Dutch, Bohemian, and German influences. Among the notable architects and sculptors of Polish/Italian mannerism were Santi Gucci, Jan Michałowicz of Urzędów, Giovanni Maria Padovano, Giovanni Battista di Quadro, Jan Frankiewicz, Galleazzo Appiani, Jan Jaroszewicz, Bernardo Morando, Kasper Fodyga, Krzysztof Bonadura, Antoneo de Galia, and many others.

== Lesser Poland Voivodeship ==
Place	Building	Date of construction	Style and history	Image
Biecz	Town Hall Tower	erected in 1569 with Ratusz built in 1569–1580	Polish mannerism (architect Jeremiasz Kwajer of Wrocław). The present clock tower was built when former 15th-century tower collapsed in 1569. It was established by Marcin Kromer. The new tower, built on square and octagonal plan, was covered with a mannerist spire and decorated with sgraffito patterns imitating rustication.	
Kalwaria Zebrzydowska	Basilica of St. Mary	1603–1609	Polish/Dutch mannerism (architects Jan Maria Bernardoni and Paul Baudarth). The church was established by Mikołaj Zebrzydowski, voivode of Kraków for Order of Friars Minor. The church was designed by Bernardoni and the construction process was conducted by Baudarth, an architect and goldsmith from Antwerp.	
Kalwaria Zebrzydowska	Ecce Homo Chapel	1605–1609	Dutch mannerism (architect Paul Baudarth). It was built on the plan of the Greek cross. The vault adorned with profuse stucco decorations in the style of Dutch mannerism.	
Kalwaria Zebrzydowska	Chapel of the Crucifixion	1600–1601	Dutch mannerism. The chapel is the first structure built by Mikołaj Zebrzydowski in Kalwaria and give a beginning to the whole complex.	
Kalwaria Zebrzydowska	Heart of Mary Chapel	1615	Dutch mannerism (architect Paul Baudarth). It was built on the plan of a heart. The chapel commemorate Jesus' encounter with Mary on the road to Calvary.	
Kraków	Boner House	1560	Polish mannerism. The original gothic building was rebuilt for Jan Firlej, Grand Marshal of the Crown and his wife Barbara Mniszech. In 1604 the wedding ceremony of Marina Mniszech and False Dmitriy I, Tsar of Russia was held in the house. Richly decorated mannerist attic (caryatids, floral and animal motives) is attributed to the workshop of Santi Gucci.	
Kraków	Branicki Manor House	c. 1603	Polish mannerism (circle of Santi Gucci). The manor house was created for Jan Branicki by enlarging the early 16th century keep. The rectangular building (12 x 10m) was decorated with sgraffito and crowned with an attic gabled with crenellation.	
Kraków	Ciborium in St. Mary's Basilica	1552	Polish mannerism (sculptor Giovanni Maria Padovano). The St. Mary's Basilica's Ciborium was established by Kraków's goldsmiths Andrzej Mastelli and Jerzy Pipan. It was made of sandstone and adorned with red Salzburg marble, alabaster and stucco. A cast bronze balustrade was created in 1595 by Michał Otto and decorated with Polish and Lithuanian coat of arms.	
Kraków	Collegium Iuridicum	1630s	Polish mannerism. Collegium Iuridicum of the Jagiellonian University was founded in 1403 for the jurists, as one of the oldest university's buildings. The original gothic building was reconstructed in the mannerist style (arcade courtyard) and early baroque style (main portal).	
Kraków	Dean's House	1582–1592	Polish mannerism (architect Santi Gucci). It is a former residence of the canons, founded in the 14th century. During the 16th-century reconstruction the arcade courtyard was added and the facade was adorned with a portal and sgraffito decoration.	
Kraków	Decjusz Villa	1630	Italian mannerism (architect Maciej Trapola). The original villa, built between 1528 and 1535 for Justus Decjusz, was rebuilt for Sebastian Lubomirski. Inspiration for this reconstruction was a renaissance treaty by Sebastiano Serlio.	
Kraków	Holy Trinity Church - Gonzaga-Myszkowski Chapel	1603–1614	Polish mannerism/early baroque (architect Santi Gucci), decorated with rustication. The chapel was modelled after the Sigismund's Chapel (1519–1533). It was founded by Zygmunt Gonzaga-Myszkowski (together with his brother Piotr, he was adopted in 1597 by Vincenzo Gonzaga, Duke of Mantua).	
Kraków	Old Synagogue - Aron Kodesh	late 16th century	Jewish mannerism (possibly workshop of Matteo Gucci). The tympanum of the Aron Kodesh bears a Hebrew inscription that reads: By me kings reign, and lawgivers decree just things (Book of Proverbs 28:17).	
Kraków	Prelate House	1618–1619	Polish mannerism (architects Maciej Litwinkowicz and Jan Zatorczyk). The characteristics are late renaissance attic by Zatorczyk (1625) and sgraffito decoration imitating diamond-pointed rustication.	
Kraków	Vasa Gate	1590	Polish mannerism. Vasa Gate was the only entrance to the Wawel Castle. The current building replaced an earlier gothic gate and was founded by king Sigismund III Vasa. The inner side was adorned with mannerist attic with palmettes, volutes and sheaves (the emblem of the house of Vasa).	
Kraków	Wawel Cathedral - Stephen Báthory Tomb	1594–1595	Polish mannerism (sculptor Santi Gucci). Established by Queen Anna Jagiellon to commemorate her husband Stephen Báthory. Made of sandstone, red marble and alabaster.	
Książ Wielki	Mirów Palace	1585–1595	Polish mannerism (architect Santi Gucci). Founded by Piotr Myszkowski, bishop of Cracow as a fortified palace (palazzo in fortezza). The palace is decorated with rusticated stonework.	
Książ Wielki	Mirów Palace Pavilion	late 16th century	Polish mannerism (architect Santi Gucci). One of two mannerist pavilions situated on the both sides of the Mirów Palace. The pavilions were built to house a library and a chapel.	
Niepołomice	Church of 10.000 Christians - Branicki Chapel	1596	Polish mannerism (architect Santi Gucci). Established by Jan Branicki, castellan of Biecz to commemorate his parents Katarzyna Kotwicz and Grzegorz Branicki.	
Niepołomice	Royal Castle	1635–1637	Polish mannerism. The major mannerist additions to the original 14th-century castle were gate (1588) and arcade courtyard (1635–1637).	
Sucha Beskidzka	Komorowski Castle	1608–1614	Polish mannerism (architect - probably Paul Baudarth). The original defensive mansion built between 1554 and 1580 was enlarged and rebuilt for Piotr Komorowski.	
Sułoszowa	Szafraniec Castle - Courtyard	after 1557-1578	Polish mannerism. The trapezoid shape courtyard was surrounded at the level of two upper storeys by arcades, embellished with 21 mascarons. The arcade risalit above the gate is a 17th-century addition.	
Sułoszowa	Szafraniec Castle - Loggia	after 1578	Polish mannerism. For the first time the 14th-century castle was rebuilt in renaissance style between 1542 and 1544 by Niccolò Castiglione with participation of Gabriel Słoński of Kraków. The sponsor of the castle reconstruction in mannerist style was a Calvinist Stanisław Szafraniec, voivode of Sandomierz. At that time the original medieval tower was transformed into a scenic double loggia decorated in the sgraffito technique.	
Tarnów	Tarnów Cathedral - Ostrogski Tomb	1612–1620	Dutch mannerism (design by Willem van den Blocke). Established by Janusz Ostrogski, voivode of Volhyn. Made of black and red marble and yellow alabaster. It depicts the kneeling figures of the founder and his first wife Zsuzsanna Serédi of Felsőnovaj. The monument was enlarged using the trompe-l'œil technique.	
Tarnów	Houses with arcades	second half of the 16th century	Polish mannerism. The house No. 20, built in about 1565, belonged to the Scottish family, the Huysons. It is adorned wit sgraffito decoration imitating rustication.	

== Lower Silesian Voivodeship ==
Place	Building	Date of construction	Style and history	Image
Krobielowice	Abbot's Palace	1596–1613	Bohemian mannerism. The renaissance mansion of St. Vincent Monastery in Ołbin, built between 1570 and 1580, was rebuilt for abbot Scultetus to house the monastery's estate administration (grangia).	
Oleśnica	Ducal Castle	1585–1608	German mannerism (architect Bernard Niuron). The original gothic castle (built by duke Konrad I of Oleśnica) was successively enlarged and rebuilt by the powerful bohemian magnates the Poděbrads. The reconstruction in mannerist style began in 1585. Duke Charles II built a new eastern and southern wings. He also rebuilt the so-called Widow Palace. The courtyard was emebllished with characteristic balconies and the main gate portal was adorned with Silesian and Poděbrad family crests.	
Sobieski's Castle in Oława	Abbot's Palace	?–1588	German mannerism. The Renaissance castle was built by master Jakub of Milan (most likely with the surname Parr, builder of the Bolków Castle), and continued by Barnard Niuron in 1588. It was constructed on the site of a medieval castle built by Duke Ludwik I built in the second half of the fourteenth century.	
Wrocław	House of the Griffins	1587–1589	German/Dutch mannerism (architect Friedrich Gross). It is the largest merchant house in Wrocław (16.25m wide), originally built in about 1300. The house was rebuilt for Daniel von Turnau und Kueschmalz and his wife Dorothea von Matte. The mannerist portal with founders' crests was carved by Gerhard Hendrik of Amsterdam. The house was named after griffins decorating the attic.	
Wrocław	St. Mary Magdalene's Church - Pulpit	1579–1580	German mannerism (sculptor Friedrich Gross). It was carved in precious materials: Ruthenian alabaster from Lviv, Silesian sandstone, marble and gabbro from the Mount Ślęża. The alabaster reliefs on the sides depicts scenes from the Old Testament - The Fall of Jericho, Elijah calling down fire from heaven on Ahaziah's soldiers, David and Goliath encounter and Daniel in the Lion's Den.	
Zagórze Śląskie	Grodno Castle	before 1587	Bohemian mannerism. The reconstruction of a medieval Piast Castle was started by Matthias von Logau (Maciej z Łagowa) and accomplished by his son Georg. The castle was adorned with beautifully carved sandstone portals and sgraffitos (Gate, 1570).	
Żórawina	Holy Trinity Church	1600–1608	German/Dutch mannerism. The 14th-century church was reconstructed in mannerist style at Adam von Hanniwaldt's initiative. The undertaking was financially supported by Adam's brother Andreas, councillor at the court of Emperor Rudolph II. Among the artists employed in decoration of the church were eminent Dutch sculptors Adriaen de Vries and Gerhard Hendrik.	

== Opole Voivodeship ==
Place	Building	Date of construction	Style and history	Image
Brzeg	Piast Castle Courtyard	1556–1558	Silesian mannerism (architect Francesco de Pario of Bissone). The original gothic castle was rebuilt for Jerzy II the Magnificent, duke of Brzeg and Legnica. It was probably inspired by Wawel Castle courtyard. The architecture of the castle's arcades bears strong resemblance to Opočno Castle in the Czech Republic and Schloss Güstrow in Germany.	
Brzeg	Piast Castle Gate	1554–1560	Silesian mannerism. The gate was adorned with profuse mannerist reliefs and sculptures of Jerzy II and his wife Barbara of Brandenburg. The busts depicts 24 Piasts, ancestors of Jerzy II - 12 rulers of Poland from the legendary Piast the Wheelwright to Władysław II the Exile and 12 dukes of Silesia from Henry I the Bearded to Frederick II of Legnica. The inspiration for this decoration were woodcuts from the 1521 Chronica Polonorum by Maciej Miechowita.	
Brzeg	Town Hall	1570–1577	Silesian mannerism (architects Jacopo de Pario and Bernard Niuron of Lugano). It was built to replace former late gothic building burned in 1569. The architecture of the building was inspired by both Polish/Bohemian (loggia) and German mannerism (attics).	
Niemodlin	Promnitz Castle	1581–1591	Bohemian mannerism. The ruined gothic castle (built in 1313 by Bolesław the Elder) was purchased in 1581 by Kaspar von Pückler from the Emperor Rudolph II. Pückler enlarged and rebuilt the castle in mannerist style. In 1610 another wing was added to close the courtyard (sponsored by new owners von Promnitz family). The castle's architecture bears strong resemblance to renaissance residencies in Bohemia (e.g. Castle in Častolovice, 1588–1615).	
Nysa	Town Scale	1602–1604	Silesian mannerism. The building was founded at bishop Johann VI. von Sitsch's initiative. It was decorated with sculptures attributed to the workshop of Georg Pullmann. The architecture of the Town Scale was inspired by both Bohemian (arcades) and German mannerism (gables).	

== Silesian Voivodeship ==
Place	Building	Date of construction	Style and history	Image
Żywiec	Cathedral tower	1582–1585	Polish/Bohemian mannerism (architect Giovanni Ricci). The tower was added to the gothic church (built before 1470) between 1582 and 1583 at initiative of Komorowski brothers - Jan Spytek and Krzysztof. The construction was conducted by a stonemason Maciej Świętek. In 1585 the stone-built tower was enhanced (17.5m high) with the upper part in brick and embellished with an arcade loggia.	
Żywiec	Komorowski Castle	1567	Polish mannerism. The original 15th-century castle was rebuilt for Jan Spytek Komorowski, cup-bearer of Kraków. The new palace was decorated with an arcade courtyard and sgraffitos.	

== Subcarpathian Voivodeship ==
Place	Building	Date of construction	Style and history	Image
Baranów Sandomierski	Leszczyński Castle	1591–1606	Polish mannerism (circle of Santi Gucci). The castle was built for Rafał Leszczyński and his son Andrzej as a fortified palace (palazzo in fortezza). The architecture of the castle merge all the characteristics of Polish mannerism - side towers, arcade courtyard and richly decorated attic.	
Jarosław	Church of Corpus Christi	1582–1594	Polish mannerism (architect Giuseppe Briccio with participation of Stefan Murator of Jarosław). Established by Zofia Odrowąż, wife of Jan Kostka, voivode of Pomerania.	
Jarosław	Orsetti House	1570–1593, 1646	Polish mannerism. Built for Stanisław Smiszowic, Jarosław's apothecary. In 1633 the building was purchased by Wilhelm Orsetti and rebuilt in 1646.	
Jarosław	Church of St. Nicolas	1615–1624	Polish mannerism. The church was founded by Anna Kostka for Benedictine Sisters. The church was built on the plan of a Latin cross. Richly decorated mannerist portal, created in 1621, was during the construction of the abbey transferred to east elevation of the church in 1635.	
Krasiczyn	Krasicki Palace	1580–1631	Polish mannerism (architect Galleazzo Appiani). The construction was started by Stanisław Krasicki and accomplished by his son Marcin Krasicki, voivode of Podolia. It was built as a fortified palace. Each tower of the Krasicki Palace is different and both inner and the outer facades were decorated with profuse sgraffitos (they cover more than 7000 square meters in total).	
Lesko	Fortified Synagogue	1626–1654	Jewish mannerism. The facade bears a Hebrew inscription that reads: He was afraid and said, "How awesome is this place! This is none other than the house of God; this is the gate of heaven." (Genesis 28:17)	
Leżajsk	Basilica of St. Mary	1618–1628	Polish mannerism (architect Antonio Pellaccini with participation of Szymon Sarocki). The church was erected by Łukasz Opaliński and his wife Anna Pilecka in gratitude to God for granted victory over the Devil of Łańcut - Stanisław Stadnicki.	
Leżajsk	Defensive Walls	first half of the 17th century	Polish mannerism. The monastery was surrounded by a wall 10 m high. The pentagonal wall tower so-called puntone was built at that time.	
Leżajsk	Monastery	1637	Polish mannerism (architect Antonio Pellaccini with participation of Szymon Sarocki). The mannerist monastery building was built adjacent to the church and connected with the church's presbytery. It was constructed as a one-storeyed four-wing building with a cloister in the center and pavilions at the corners.	
Przemyśl	Kazimierz Castle	beginning of the 17th century	Polish mannerism (architect Galleazzo Appiani). The original 14th-century castle was rebuilt for Marcin Krasicki. The mannerist decorations of tower link to solutions adopted in Krasiczyn Palace.	
Przemyśl	Carmelite Church	1624–1630	Polish mannerism (architect - probably Galleazzo Appiani). The church was founded in 1620 by Marcin Krasicki, starost of Przemyśl and owner of Krasiczyn. The construction started in 1630 and was conducted by master craftsman Ligęski of Przemyśl.	
Przemyśl	Przemyśl Cathedral - Fredro Tomb	after 1622	Polish mannerism. The tomb monument was constructed for Jan Fredro, castellan of Przemyśl and his wife Anna ze Stadnickich. It was carved in limestone and alabaster in tuscan order. The top of the tomb is decorated with a sculpture of archangel Michael.	
Rzeszów	Bernardine Church	1610-1629	German/Polish mannerism (Leipzig architects). Established by Mikołaj Spytek Ligęza in 1610. The church architecture bears strong resemblance to contemporary German style inspired by gothic patterns. The sole tower with main entry was adorned with one line of ascending windows crowned with two small windows at the top (e.g. Protestant church in Gollma, Landsberg, Saxony-Anhalt). The Latin cross (or "cruciform") plan, with a long nave ended with a round presbytery also refers to gothic style.	
Rzeszów	Alabaster Altar in Bernardine Church	before 1637	German mannerism. Commissioned by Mikołaj Spytek Ligęza and executed by Johann Pfister or Johann Behem. The central bas-relief in alabaster depicts the Lamentation of Christ and is supplemented with seven wooden, waxed and gilded reliefs with scenes from the Passion (from bottom right): Christ in the Garden of Olives, Flagellation, Crowning with thorns, Fall under the cross, Christ being nailed to the Cross, Elevation of the Cross and Descent from the Cross and three alabaster reliefs in predella: the Archangel Gabriel, Saint Anne and the Annunciation.	
Rzeszów	Ligęza Mausoleum in Bernardine Church	1630-1638	German/Italian mannerism (attributed to Sebastiano Sala of Lugano). Tomb monuments of the Ligęza family were established by Mikołaj Spytek Ligęza. The life size sculptures depicts eight most prominent members of the family as orants facing towards the altar. The statues were made of alabaster and integrated into the northern and the southern wall of the chancel.	

== Świętokrzyskie Voivodeship ==
Place	Building	Date of construction	Style and history	Image
Bejsce	Church of St. Nicholas - Firlej Chapel	1594–1601	Polish mannerism (architect Tomasz Nikiel of Pińczów). Tęczyński Chapel was founded by Mikołaj Firlej, voivode of Kraków to commemorate himself and his first wife Elżbieta Ligęza. The chapel was modelled after the Sigismund's Chapel in Kraków, and its profuse interior decorations are attributed to the workshop of Santi Gucci.	
Kielce	Bishops' Palace	1637–1644	Italian/Dutch mannerism (architect Tommaso Poncino). The palace was established by Jakub Zadzik, bishop of Kraków. The building was inspired by the royal residences in Warsaw and modelled in the so-called Poggio–Reale style after Villa Poggio Reale in Naples. Steep roofs, towers and decorations are Dutch style features.	
Kielce	Kielce Cathedral	1632–1635	Polish mannerism. The original romanesque church (built in 1171) was enlarged and rebuilt at cardinal John Albert Vasa's initiative.	
Pińczów	Church of St. John the Baptist	beginning of the 17th century	Polish mannerism. The original 1380 building was rebuilt in the mannerist style in the beginning of the 17th century, when the Polish Brethren were exiled from the city. The western facade with mannerist gable was accomplished in 1642.	
Pińczów	Garden Pavilion	late 16th century	Polish mannerism (architect Santi Gucci). The building is the only preserved of four garden pavilions of the Pińczów Castle. The pavilion was built on a pentagonal plan and covered with tented roof; the portal was adorned with Jastrzębiec coat of arms.	
Pińczów	Old Synagogue	1594–1609	Jewish mannerism (possibly workshop of Santi Gucci). In 1594 Zygmunt Gonzaga-Myszkowski issues a privilege asserting the Pińczów Jewish community's right to build a synagogue.	
Pińczów	St. Anne's Chapel	1600	Polish mannerism (architect Santi Gucci). The building was established by Zygmunt Gonzaga-Myszkowski, marquess in Mirów to commemorate a Jubilee of 1600.	
Rytwiany	Church of the Annunciation	1624–1637	Polish mannerism. The church was established by Jan Magnus Tęczyński, starost of Płock for Camaldolese Brothers. The construction process, according to Italian patterns, was conducted by friar Hyacinth.	
Sandomierz	Town Hall tower	beginning of the 17th century	Polish mannerism. The original 14th-century building was rebuilt in the renaissance style in the 16th century.	
Sandomierz	Collegium Gostomianum	1604–1615	Polish mannerism (architect Michał Hintz). The building was established in 1602 by Hieronim Gostomski, voivode of Poznań for the Jesuits.	
Staszów	Church of St. Bartholomew - Tęczyński Chapel	1618–1625	Polish mannerism (Pińczów workshop, circle of Santi Gucci). Tęczyński Chapel was founded by Katarzyna Leszczyńska to commemorate her husband Andrzej Tęczyński, castellan of Bełz and son Jacek. The chapel was modelled after the Sigismund's Chapel and decorated with rustication.	
Ujazd	Krzyżtopór	1621–1644	Polish mannerism/early baroque (architect Wawrzyniec Senes of Sent). The palace was built for Krzysztof Ossoliński as a fortified palace with bastions on plan of a regular pentagon. Krzyżtopór has 4 towers (seasons of the year), 12 halls (months), 52 chambers (weeks of the year) and 365 windows (days of the year).	

== See also ==
- List of mannerist structures in Central Poland
- List of mannerist structures in Northern Poland
