= Rogala coat of arms =

Polish coat of arms

Rogala
- Alternative names: Czabory, Celbarz
- Earliest mention: 1109
- Families: Armański, Bajewski, Bandorski, Bech, Bech, Bechowski, Becke, Bendorski, Bielanowski, Bieniecki, Bobola, Bolko, Bolszewski, Bolszowski, Bołoto, Borowski, Brodzyński, Brzeżański, Budlewski, Butkowski, Charbaszewski, Charmański, Charytonienko, Chinowski, Chormański, Chrzanowski, Chądzyński, Chynowski, Cielemęcki, Cieśliński, Czachorowski, Czambor, Czarnocki, Czartkowski, Dawidowicz, Dobrzyszewski, Drogosz, Duczymiński, Eumanow, Filcz, Fuliński, Głuchowski, Głuszyński, Górski, Grabowieński, Grunenberg, Harbaszewski, Hermanowski, Hermeus, Hirosz, Hodicki, Iwan, Iwanowski, Janulin, Jarzecki, Jarzęcki, Jarzycki, Jeziorski, Jezierski (Ežerskis), Jutowski, Jutrowski, Kaczorowski, Kałuski, Karniewski, Każniewski, Kaźniewski, Kiciński, Kiełpiński, Kiłdysz, Kobrzyński, Kocieński, Koczorowski, Kolbrzyński, Kolczyński, Koliczewski, Koliczkowski, Kolitowski, Kosieński, Kosiński, Kostecki, Kostkiewicz, Kościeński, Krasicki, Krasowski, Krassowski, Kulczyński, Kuliczkowski, Kummern, Kunstetter, Kurosz, Kurski, Kuwieczyński, Lapanowski, Lechwal, Lewald, Lewalt, Lewicki, Lewoniewicz, Lgocki, Lipski, Lissonicki, Lissoniski, Loga, Loka, Lork, Lubonicki, Lubonidzki, Luboniecki, Luk, Luka, Lunowski, Łapanowski, Łapinoski, Łapinowski, Łazowski, Łosicki, Łosiecki, Łuka, Łysomicki, Machciński, Machnacki, Marciewski, Marczewski, Marusiewski, Maruszewski, Młodzianowski, Nakonieczny, Niczgórski, Niwicki, Nowicki, Odrzywolski, Oniśko, Orczyński, Orecha, Orechwa, Orzechowski, Osikowski, Oskolski, Osmolski, Pałukowski, Parafianowicz, Parafinowicz, Paruszewski, Pikulski, Pilchowski, Pilkiewicz, Pilko, Popiełowski, Poruć, Poruszewski, Powalski, Powołkowski, Powołowski, Punikiewski, Rajkowski, Rasiński, Raszyński, Raykowski, Rembiewski, Remiszowski, Rębiewski, Ręczajski, Ręczayski, Ręczyński, Rogala, Rogalewicz, Rogalewski, Rogaliński, Rogalski, Rogieński, Rogiński, Rogowicz, Rokicki, Rosocki, Rozwadowski, Różewski, Rudgierz, Ryński, Rzekiecki, Sanchocino, Sancugniewski, Sancugniowski, Seroczyński, Sidłowski, Sieciński, Sieczyński, Sierpiński, Skalski, Skałka, Skolski, Skomowski, Skromowski, Skulski, Słąkowski, Sobieszczański, Sobieściański, Sąchocki, Suchociński, Swaracki, Swarecki, Swarocki, Swierski, Szczygielski, Szwaracki, Szwaradzki, Targowski, Tatkiewicz, Tchorzewski, Tchórzewski, Trembiński, Trębiński, Trosiński, Troszyński, Trzylatkowski, Trzylątkowski, Turski, Tyrau, Uwieleński, Uwiliński, Wasilewski, Wencki, Wensło, Wentzki, Wessel, Węcki, Węgrzynowski, Wężeł, Wiśniewski, Witnikowicz, Wągrocki, Wągrodzki, Wybicki, Wydrażewski, Zaborowski, Zagorzycki, Zagórny, Zagórski, Zawadzki, Zembocki, Zębocki, Żarnowski, Żarnowski de Biberstein, Żernicki, Żyrnicki, Świerski, Świrski

Rogala is a Polish coat of arms, likely based upon armorial bearings imported from Northeastern Germany to Poland around 1109, by members of the von Bibersztein family (whose arms feature a 5-tined stag's horn). Polish descendants of this family later added a second horn, that of the Urus or European Bison, to create the Rogala arms. It was used by numerous szlachta families in the time of the Polish–Lithuanian Commonwealth.

== History ==
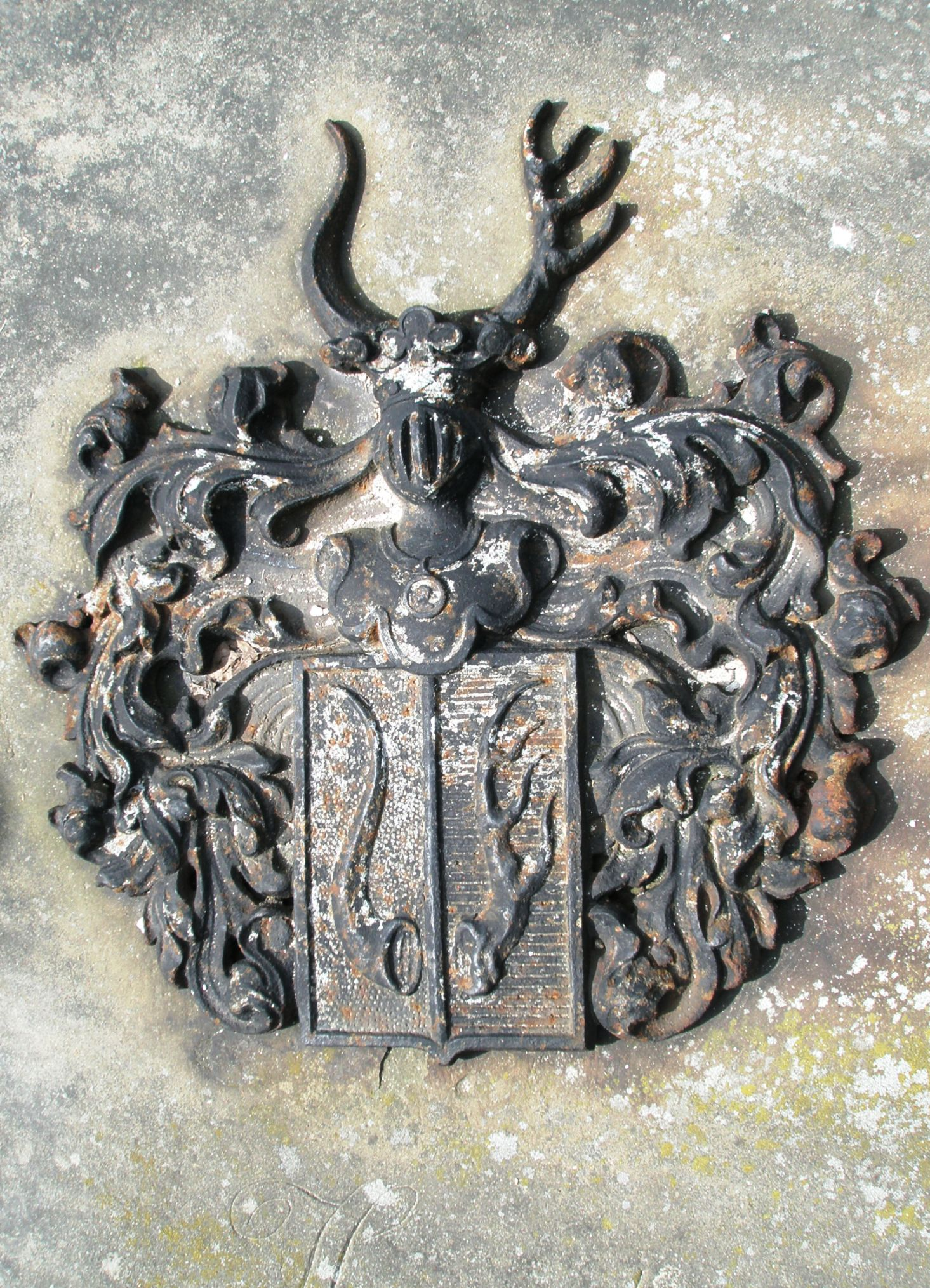
Stone relief of the Rogala armorial achievement in Komorní Lhotka, today Moravian-Silesian Region Czech republic, formerly Duchy of Cieszyn

== Blazon ==
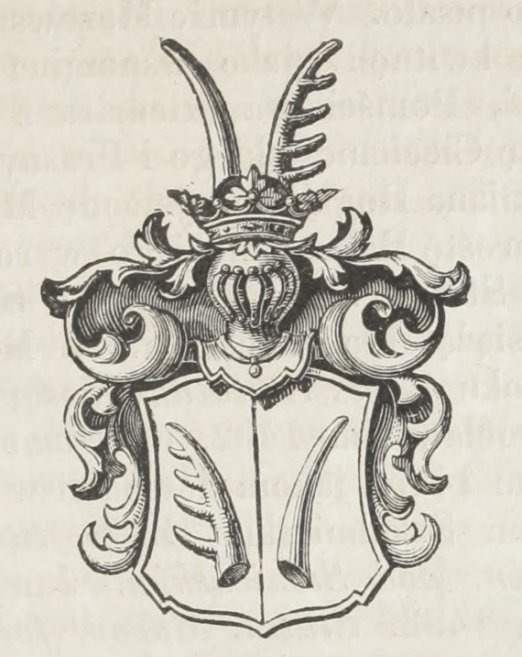
Rogala coat of arms from the armorial of Kasper Niesiecki (vol. 8, 1841)

Heraldist Kasper Niesiecki describes it as white with a red deer horn, and red with a white bull horn. The horns' place is swapped on the helmet.

== Notable bearers ==
Notable bearers of these arms include:

- House of Krasicki
- Ignacy Krasicki
- Józef Wybicki — Author of Polish national anthem, Mazurek Dąbrowskiego (Polski)
- Kost Levytsky (1859-1941) — Ukrainian politician, Chairman of State Secretariat of West Ukraine
- Mykhailo Levytsky (1774-1858) — Metropolitan Archbishop of the Ukrainian Greek Catholic Church
- Volodymyr Levytsky (1872-1956) — Ukrainian mathematician
- Feliks Turski (1729–1800), bishop
- Wasielewski
- Karol Aleksander Krasicki
- Wiseł Czambor
- Ignacy Zaborowski
- Albrycht Zaborowski
- Janusz Kałuski
- Kulczyński
- Józef Zawadzki (chemist)[4]
- Aleksander Zawadzki (naturalist)
- Augustyn Ludwik Michał Brzeżański
- Tadeusz Zawadzki
- Jan Boży Krasicki
- Ksawery (Xavier) Franciszek Krasicki
- Wacław Denhoff-Czarnocki
- Norbert Lewald-Jezierski
- Stanisław Sieciński
- Piotr Pilik
- Władysław Rozwadowski *
- Jan Gotfryd Biberstein-Krasicki *
- Jerzy Krasicki [3]
- Casmir Koczorowski [3]
- Bruno-Denis-Aeropagite-Marcel Kicinski [3]
- Samuel-Albert Lewicki [3]
- Kazimierz-Witold-Stanislaw Zawadzki [3]
- Stefan Rogala-Bojakowski

== See also ==
- Krasiczyn Castle
- Polish heraldry
- Heraldry
- Coat of arms
- List of Polish nobility coats of arms

== Related coat of arms ==
- Hodyc coat of arms
- Iwanowski coat of arms
- Biberstein coat of arms

== Sources ==
- Dynastic Genealogy
- Ornatowski.com
- sejm-wielki.pl [4]
- Herbarz polski Kaspra Niesieckiego S.J.By Kasper Niesiecki [5]
