= Przemyśl Castle =

Castle in Poland

Coordinates: 49°46′50″N 22°45′54″E

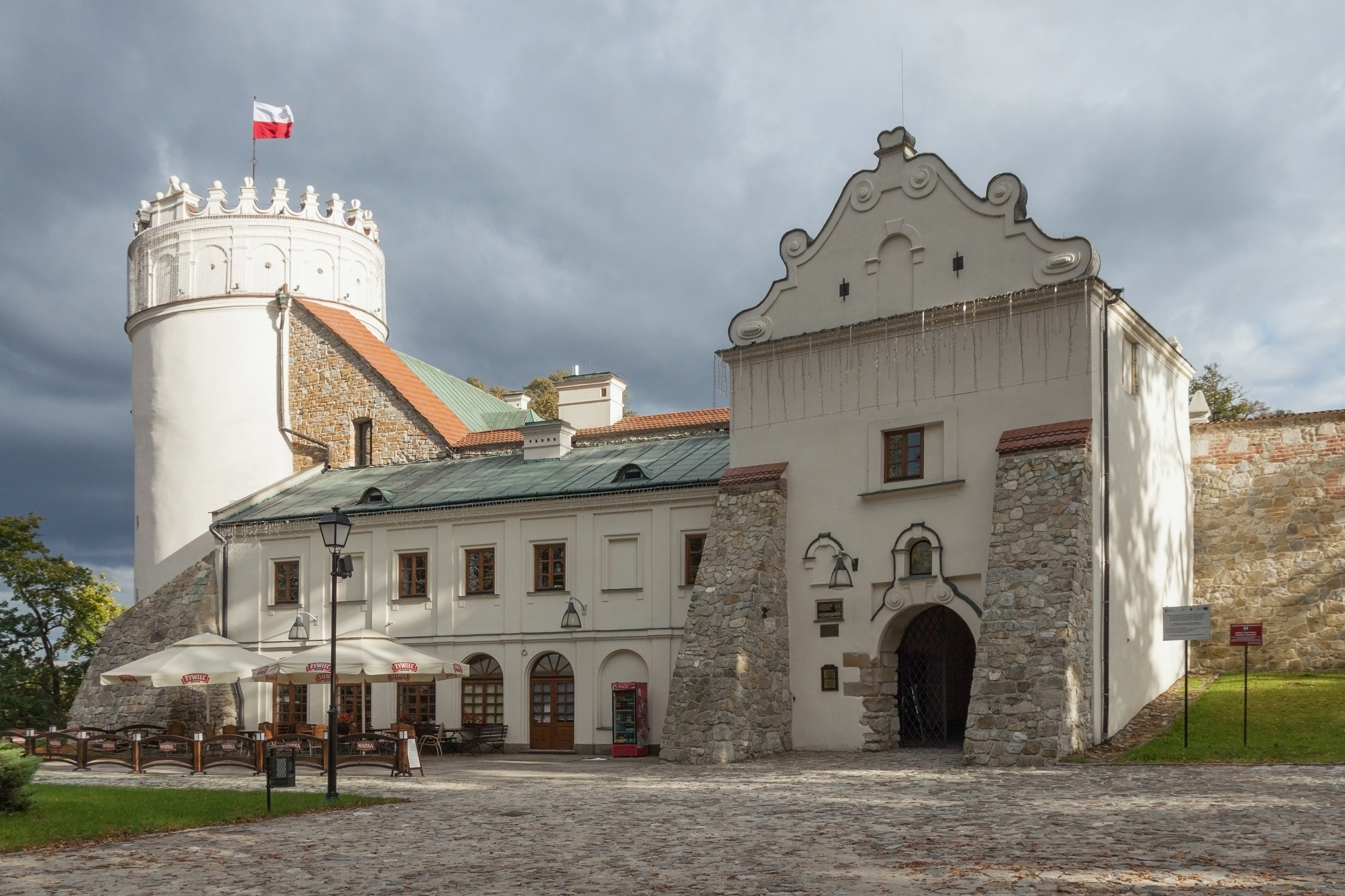
The northern wing of the Przemyśl Castle

Przemyśl Castle or Casimir Castle (Polish: Zamek Przemyśl or Polish: Zamek Kazimierzowski) is a Renaissance castle in Przemyśl, Poland, located on the Castle Hill, which rises to a height of 270 metres above sea level and 70 meters above the city and the San River.

== History ==
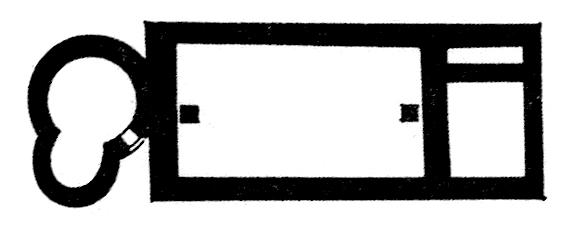
Foundations of the stone Romanesque rotunda and palatium complex built by the Polish king Bolesław I Chrobry in the 11th century

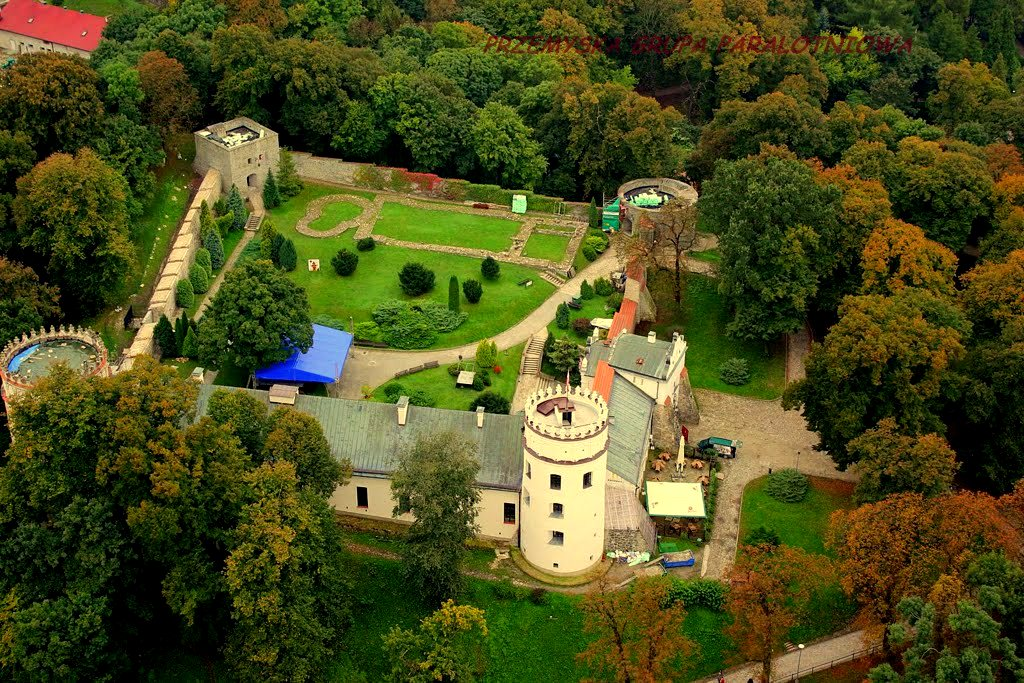
Aerial view of Przemyśl castle

The location of Przemyśl castle and the earlier settlement lay on an important river crossing on a trade route running from the Black Sea to the Baltic Sea and through the Carpathian passes, and was the site of a fortified grod belonging to the Lendians (Lendizi), who were a West Slavic tribe descended from the White Croats.

In 1018, the Polish king Bolesław I Chrobry recaptured Przemyśl and built a stone Romanesque rotunda and palatium complex. Later, Casimir III the Great was responsible for the building of a Gothic castle in 1340, of which only a gate in Ogive style survives to this day. The buildings were damaged by the invading Vlachs in 1498, and rebuilt once again for Piotr Kmita Sobieński.

Przemyśl town elder Marcin Krasicki began the reconstruction of the castle in the Renaissance style in 1616. The works were supervised by the Italian architect Galleazzo Appiani. Towers were raised and attics finished, and more housing was attached, however after Krasicki's death, the reconstruction of the castle stopped.

From 1759 to 1762, Przemyśl mayor and future Polish king Stanislaw Poniatowski rebuilt the castle, rebuilding the ruins of two towers, the wall between them, building a new castle and adding stepped buttresses.

After the partition of the Commonwealth, the Austrians stationed troops in the castle. Eventually in 1865, the castle was handed over to the city where from 1884 the dramatic society Fredreum has been based. During World War I, the Austrians held two thousand Russian prisoners in the castle. Further restoration of the castle was carried out in 1920, and in 1980 two corner towers and curtain wall between them were rebuilt.

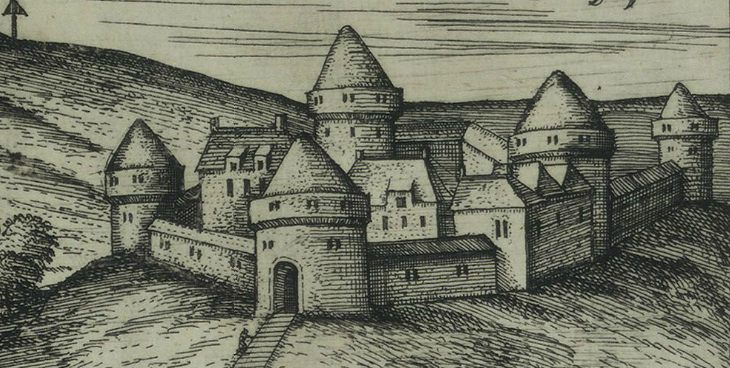
Castle in 1617

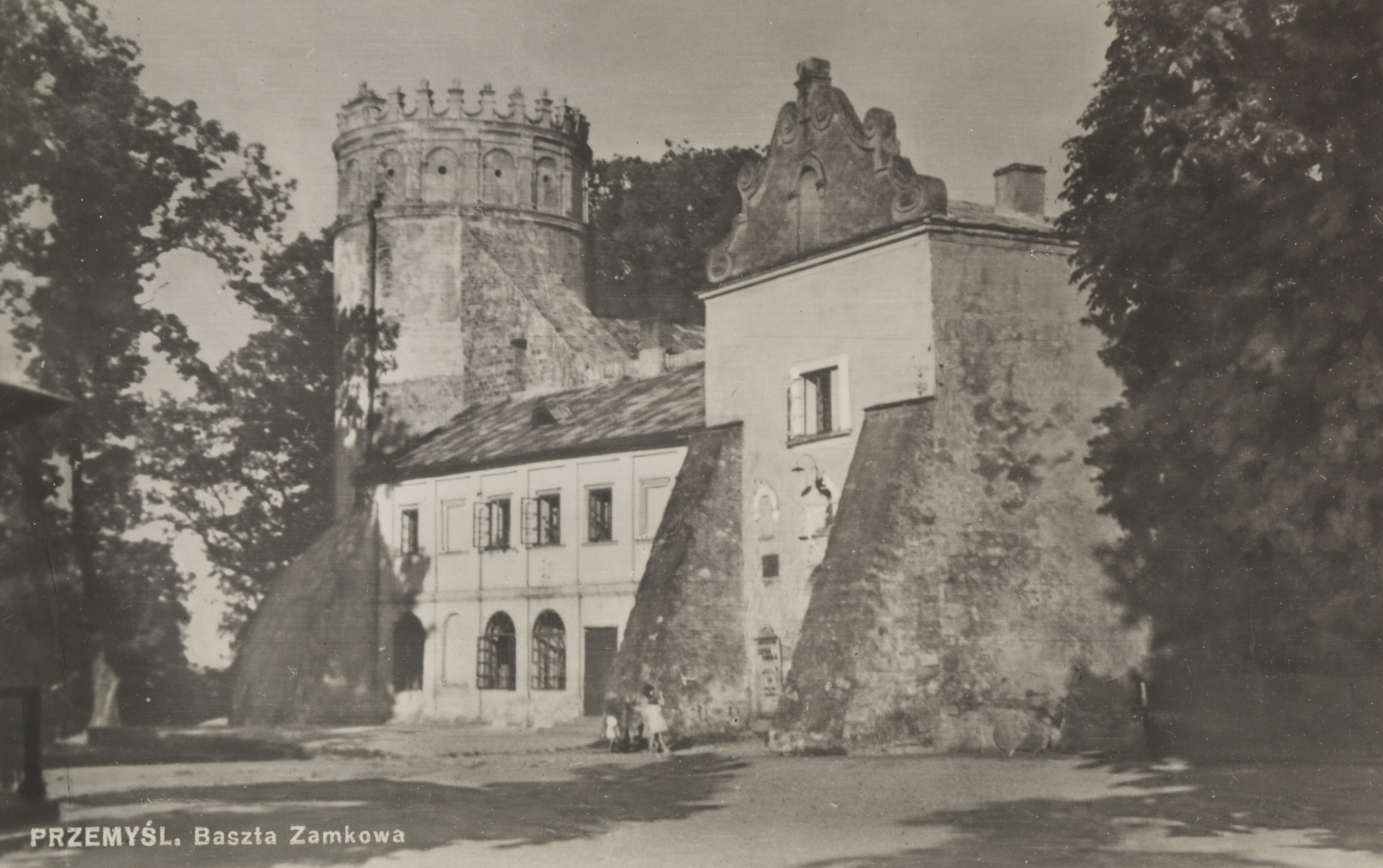
Tower, before 1937

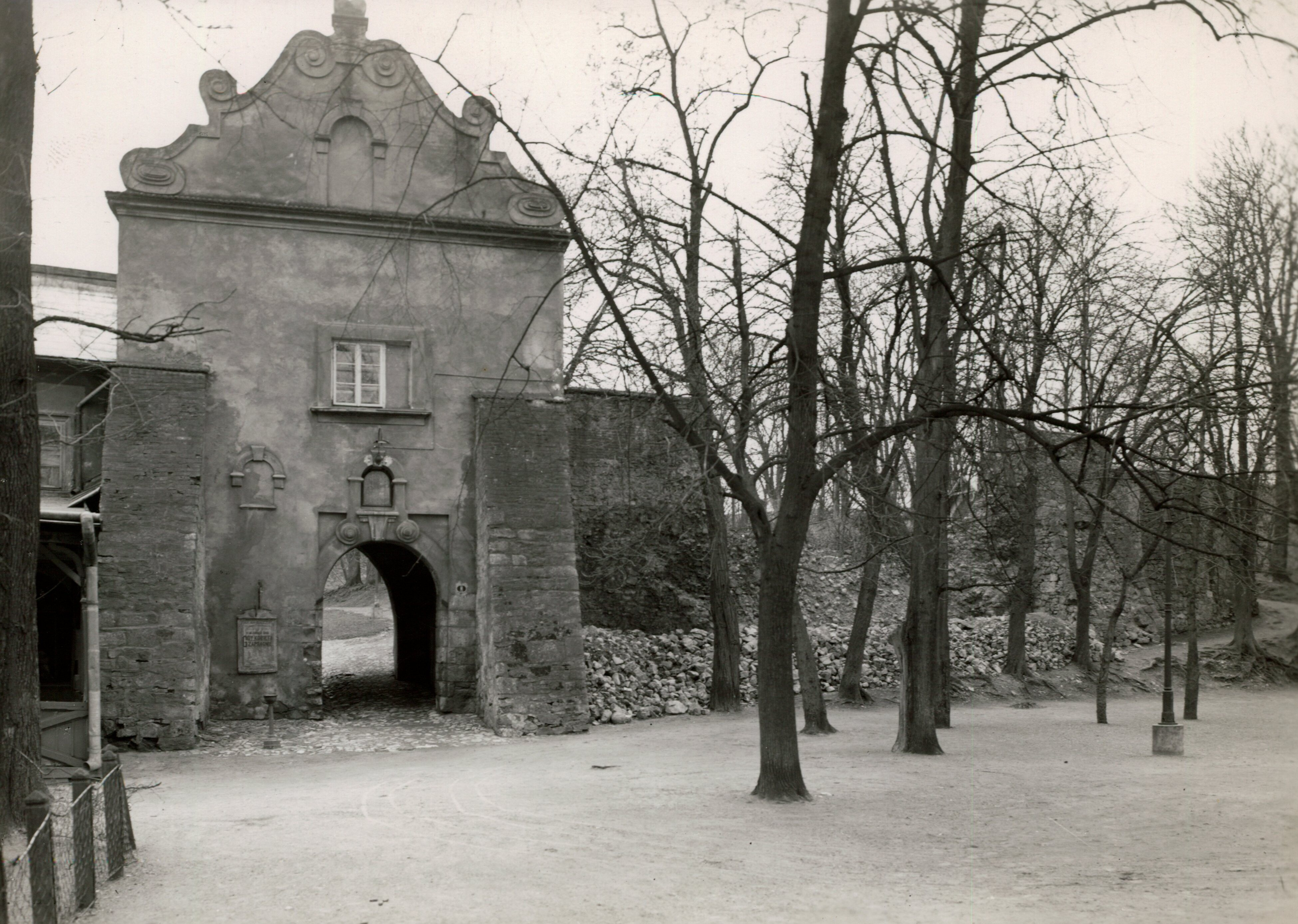
Gate, before 1939

== See also ==
- Castles in Poland
