= Carolyne zu Sayn-Wittgenstein =

Polish noble (1819–1887)

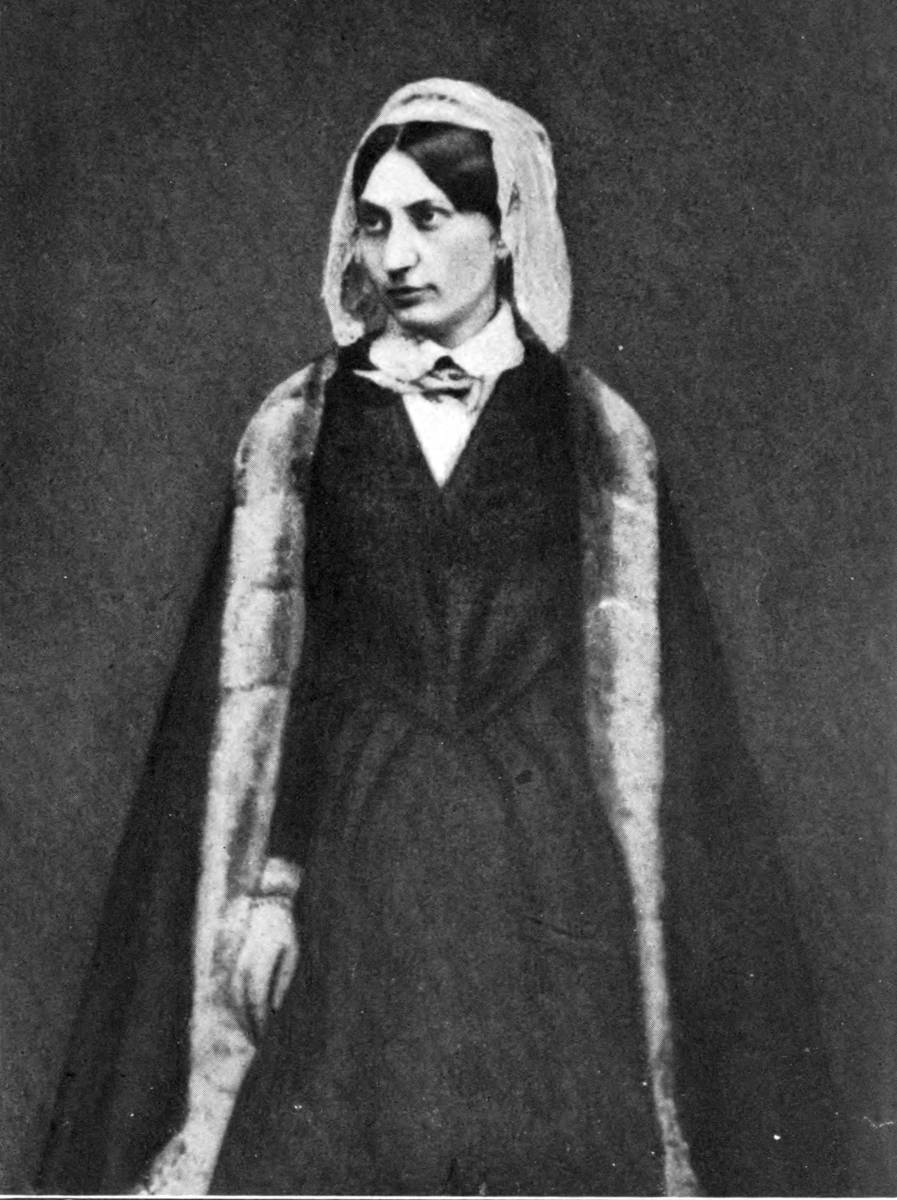
Princess Sayn-Wittgenstein in an 1847 daguerreotype

Princess Carolyne zu Sayn-Wittgenstein (née Iwanowska, Polish: Karolina Elżbieta Sayn-Witgenstein; 8 February 1819 – 9 March 1887) was a Polish noblewoman who is best known for her 40-year relationship with musician Franz Liszt. She was also an amateur journalist and essayist. It is conjectured that she did much of the actual writing of several of Liszt's publications, especially his 1852 Life of Chopin. She maintained an enormous correspondence with Liszt and many others, which is of vital historical interest. She admired and encouraged Hector Berlioz, as is clear from their extensive correspondence, and Berlioz dedicated his Les Troyens to her.

== Biography ==
=== Early years and first marriage ===
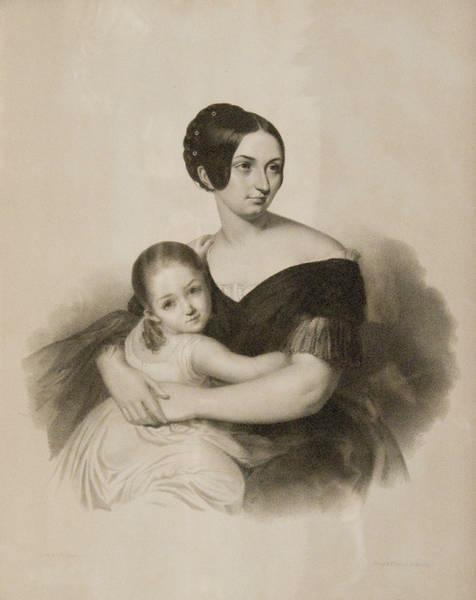
Carolyne with her daughter Marie in 1840

Karolina Elżbieta Iwanowska was born at her maternal grandfather's home in Monasterzyska, now in western Ukraine but then part of the Kingdom of Galicia and Lodomeria, a crownland of the Austrian Empire. She was the only child of wealthy parents, members of the untitled Polish nobility, Piotr Iwanowski (1791–1844) and his wife, Paulina Leonharda Podowska whose massive holdings of land in Podolia included more than 30,000 serfs. On 26 April 1836, just two months after her 17th birthday (and with pressure from her father), Carolyne married Prince Nicholas von Sayn-Wittgenstein-Berleburg-Ludwigsburg (1812–1864), a German officer in the Russian service who was also a member of an ancient noble house as the son of Prince Peter zu Sayn-Wittgenstein-Berleburg-Ludwigsburg. They briefly lived together in Kyiv (where Nicholas served as the governor), but she was unhappy in the city and moved to her country home at Woronińce (today Voronivtsi (Воронівці), in Khmilnyk Raion), one of her family's many estates. They had one child together, Marie Pauline Antoinette (1837–1920), who in 1859 married Prince Konstantin of Hohenlohe-Schillingsfürst.

=== Independence and Liszt ===
Princess Carolyne was a fervent Roman Catholic, but separated from her husband after only a few years of marriage. In 1844 her father died, leaving her a fortune. On 2 February 1847 (O.S.), while on a business trip to Kyiv, she attended a piano recital by Franz Liszt during his third tour of the Russian Empire, at the peak of his international celebrity. After meeting in person, she invited him to Woronińce, first for her daughter's 10th birthday party and then for an extended stay. In September 1847, Liszt permanently retired from touring and began living with Carolyne at Woronińce, where he composed significant portions of the Harmonies poétiques et religieuses. The following year, they moved together to the German city of Weimar, where Liszt had already been appointed as Kapellmeister Extraordinaire, and where the couple would remain for over a decade.

=== Rome and attempted annulment ===
Eventually, Carolyne wished to regularise their situation and marry Liszt, but since her husband was still living, she had to convince the Roman Catholic authorities that her marriage to him had been invalid. After an intricate process that involved moving to Rome and making two direct papal audiences, she temporarily was successful (September 1860), and the couple planned to marry in Rome on 22 October 1861, Liszt's 50th birthday. Liszt arrived in Rome the previous day, only to find the princess unable to marry him. It is possible that both her husband and the tsar of Russia managed to quash permission for the marriage at the Vatican. The Russian government also impounded her several estates (she owned thousands of serfs), which made her later marriage to Liszt, or anyone else, unfeasible. Furthermore, the scandal would have seriously harmed her daughter's marriageability, clearly the main reason why the prince put an end to his wife's scheduled remarriage but this was a real problem only before the marriage of their daughter in 1859.

=== Rome alone ===
After the aborted wedding, Carolyne's relationship with Liszt became one of platonic companionship, especially after 1865 when he received minor orders in the Catholic Church and became an abbé. Though they no longer lived together, they remained connected, for example dining together when Liszt was in Rome, and naming each other as chief beneficiary of their wills.

Carolyne spent her final several decades in Rome writing extensively (and very critically) on church issues. She was devastated by Liszt's death and survived him only a few months, dying on 9 March 1887 in Rome.

== Works ==
Carolyne zu Sayn-Wittgenstein was a prolific writer, publishing at least 44 volumes of prose from 1868 to 1887. Most of her works were privately printed; the chief of these was Causes intérieures de la faiblesse extérieure de l'Église en 1870 (the title could be translated as "The Inward Reasons for the Church's Outward Weakness"), a massive 24-volume undertaking. This work was compared to the liberal heterodoxy of Lamennais, and Volumes III and V were placed on the Index Librorum Prohibitorum, the Catholic Church's list of banned books. Her preface to the first volume argues that her writings, "which seem to reveal the weaknesses of the Church, actually reveal its strength. By showing the "inner causes" of its weakness, they show at the same time that these causes come from human faults. These are therefore excusable, the government of the Church having been entrusted by the Man-God who established it not to the angels, but to men, always imperfect." She argues that "the ills of the Church are curable" if the Church acknowledges the presence, causes, and effects of those ills.

A posthumous publication was La vie chrétienne au milieu du monde et en notre siècle. Entretiens pratiques recueillis et publiés par Henri Lasserre, Paris 1895.

She also left voluminous correspondence, not only with Liszt but also with Berlioz, Émile Ollivier, Mieczysław Kamieński, and other figures. Liszt's biographer Alan Walker describes her style as "heavy going, calling for dogged persistence... Some of [her letters] run to twenty or thirty pages of densely packed prose, and there are times when that prose becomes so prolix that it loses touch with reality."
