= Carmelite Church, Przemyśl =

Coordinates: 49°46′48″N 22°46′16″E

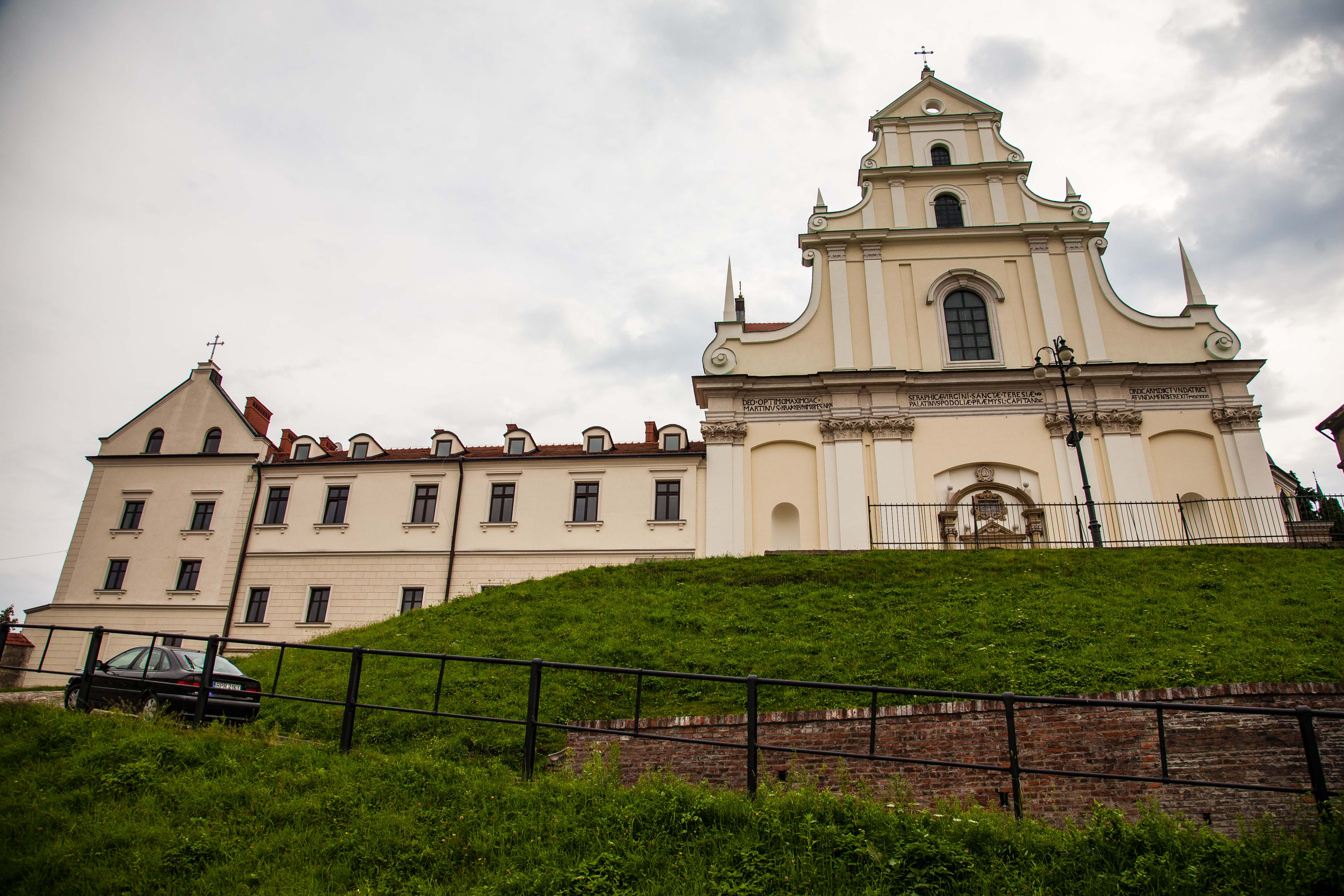
Carmelite Church of St. Theresa

The Carmelite Church of St. Theresa is a late-Renaissance church in the city of Przemyśl, in the Subcarpathian Voivodship in southern Poland.

== History ==
=== Beginnings ===
The Catholic order of Carmelites came to Przemyśl in 1620. Their church was founded by the duke of Podolia, Michał Krasicki, and constructed in the years 1627-1631 most probably according to the design of Galleazzo Appiani. The interior is explicitly Baroque, including a pulpit with a ship-like shape.

=== Partitions ===
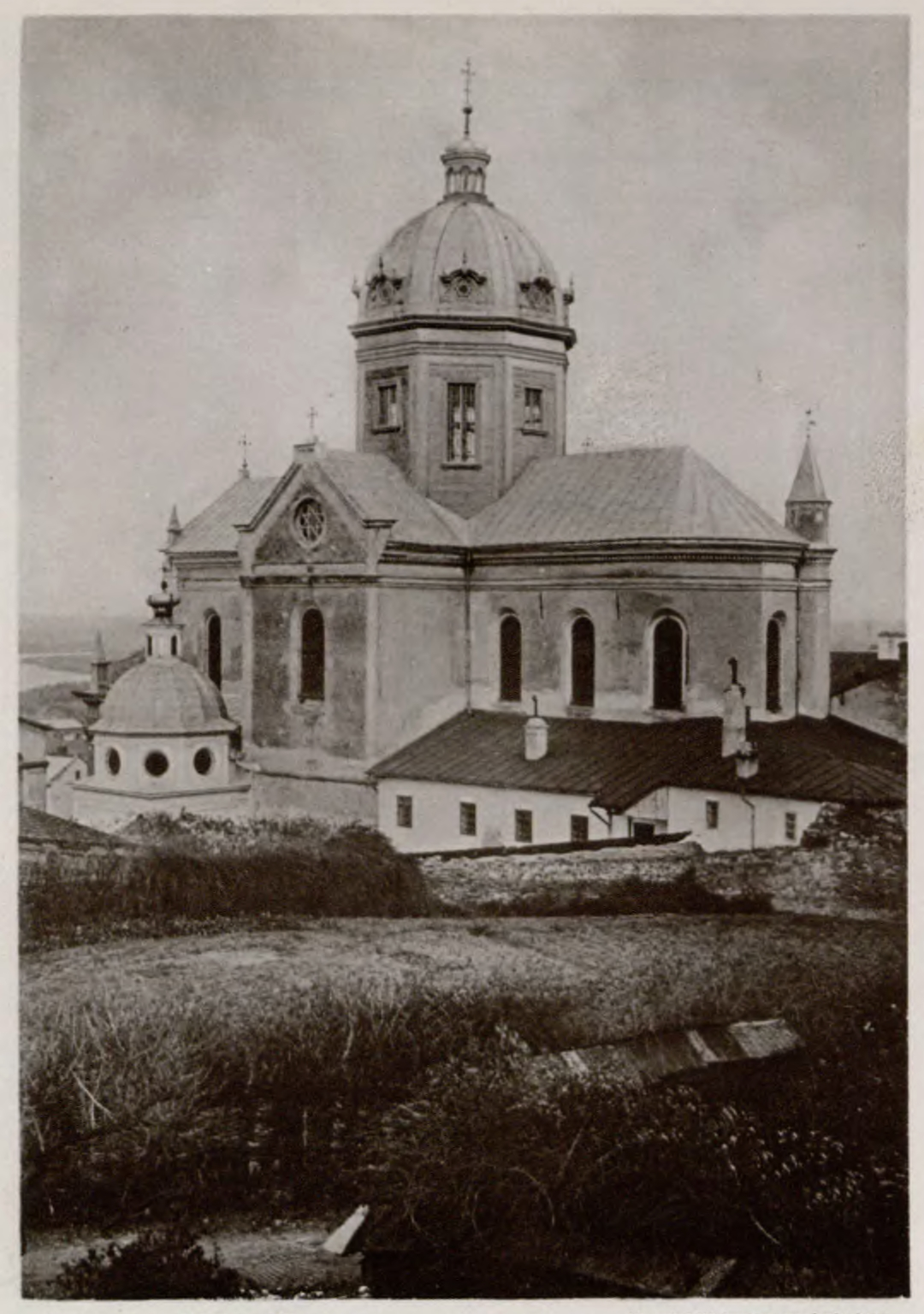
Cathedral of John the Baptist

In 1772 after the First Partition of Poland the city fell under Austrian rule, which by a decree of Joseph II liquidated the order in 1784. The Austrian authorities also blocked the ongoing construction of a Greek Catholic Cathedral (an already erected belfry was later turned into a clock tower) and instead offered the town's Ukrainian population the confiscated Carmelite Church as part of a plan to solidify their rule over the newly acquired territory by setting its inhabitants against each other.

In 1884, Ukrainian architect Mykola Zakharevych, a professor at Lviv Polytechnic, designed and built an addition a dome modeled that was modeled on St. Peter's Basilica in Rome which also incorporated elements of Ukrainian wooden church architecture. This dome was meant to symbolize the Ukrainian congregation's connection to the Vatican.

=== 20th century ===
The 1925 Concordat between Poland and the holy See confirmed that the building belongs to the Greek Catholic Church.

Soon after the Second World War a Soviet controlled communist government expelled most of the Ukrainians from Przemyśl during the Operation Vistula, including most of the clergy and bishop Josaphat Kotsylovsky (Jozefat Kocyłowski), who was martyred.

In 1946 Carmelite friars, who were forced to leave their monasteries in Soviet Ukraine, settled in Przemyśl and returned to the empty church. In 1991, shortly after Poland regained full independence and the Church was able to freely operate, the church building became a focal point of Polish-Ukrainian tensions.

The Latin Catholic Church decided to transfer the building to the Greek Catholic Church for the period of five years during which the Greek Catholics would construct a new sanctuary in Przemyśl and then give the church back to the Carmelite Order. It was felt by the Poles, that the Ukrainians, who perceived the return of the building as historical justice, had no intention of returning the church after this period of time. Local Poles occupied the church to prevent its transfer, and the Latin Catholic Church transferred a former Jesuit church to the Greek Catholics. Pope John Paul II wished to return the church to the Ukrainian Catholics who had used it prior to their expulsion by the Soviets.

The Carmelites begun modification of architectural details of the Cathedral to give it more of a Latin-rite appearance and erase traces of the church's links to Ukrainian Greek Catholicism. The belltower was a target due to its easily seen Cyrillic inscriptions. Latin Catholics in the city argued that the church which was originally Latin Catholic, confiscated and given to Ukrainians by Austrian authorities, was rightfully returned to the Poles. In 1996, against the orders of the conservator general of historical monuments in Poland, Prof. Andrzej Tomaszewski, the Carmelites destroyed the Habsburg-era dome of the church, claiming that it disrupted Przemysl's "Polish" skyline, being ‘orthodox’ - despite it being modelled on the dome of S Peter’s Rome an act which sparked protests amongst Ukrainians in Przemyśl. The Carmelite church continues to serve the faithful of the Latin Rite.

The church includes a plaque commemorating victims of the Ukrainian Insurgent Army.
