= Iwanowski coat of arms =

Polish coat of arms

Iwanowski
- Families: Iwanowski

Iwanowski is a Polish coat of arms. It was used by the Iwanowski Polish noble family.

== History ==
It derived from the Rogala coat of arms, previously used by the noble Iwanowski family.

== Blazon ==
Blazon is described with two white deer horn. The horns' place is swapped on the helmet.

== See also ==
- Polish heraldry
- Heraldic family
- List of Polish nobility coats of arms

== Related coat of arms ==
- Rogala coat of arms
- Hodyc coat of arms

== Sources ==
- Dynastic Genealogy
