= Attic (architecture) =

Storey or low wall above the cornice of a classical façade

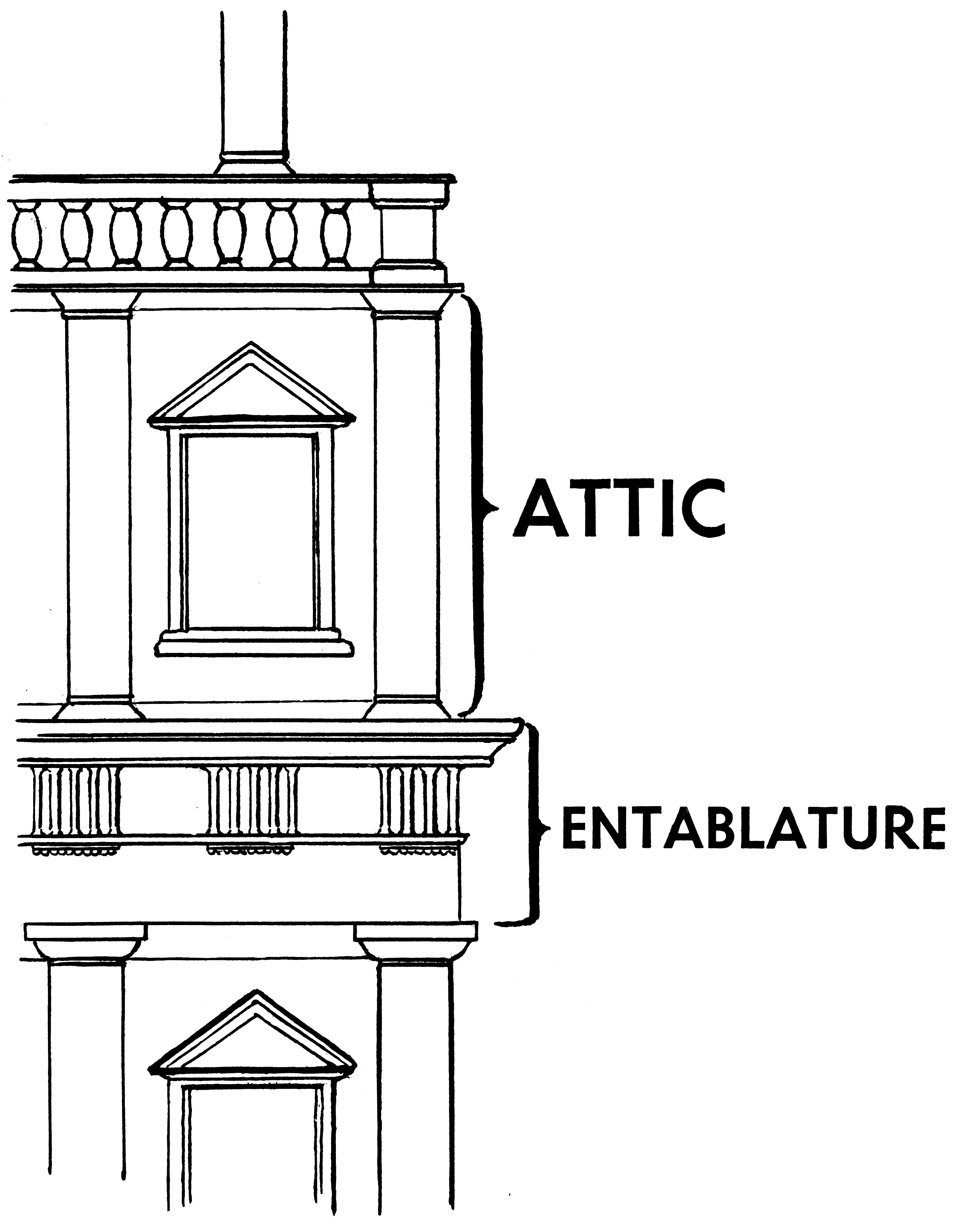
Attic

In classical architecture, the term attic refers to a storey or a parapet above the cornice of a classical façade. The decoration of the topmost part of a building was particularly important in ancient Greek architecture and this came to be seen as typifying the Attica style, the earliest example known being that of the monument of Thrasyllus in Athens.

It was largely employed in Ancient Rome, where their triumphal arches utilized it for inscriptions or for bas-relief sculpture. It was used also to increase the height of enclosure walls such as those of the Forum of Nerva. By the Italian revivalists it was utilized as a complete storey, pierced with windows, as found in Andrea Palladio's work in Vicenza and in Greenwich Hospital, London. One well-known large attic surmounts the entablature of St. Peter's Basilica, which measures 12 metres (39 ft) in height.

Decorated attics with pinnacles are often associated with the Late Renaissance (Mannerist architecture) period in Poland and are viewed as a distinct feature of Polish historical architecture (attyka polska). Many examples can be found throughout the country, notably at Wawel Castle in Kraków, Gdańsk, Poznań, Lublin, Tarnów, Zamość, Sandomierz and Kazimierz Dolny. Possibly the best example of a rich Italianate attic is at Krasiczyn Castle.

This usage became current in the 17th century from the use of Attica style pilasters as adornments on the top story's façade. By the 18th century this meaning had been transferred to the space behind the wall of the highest story (i.e., directly under the roof), producing the modern meaning of the word "attic".
