= Cathedral of St. John the Baptist, Przemyśl =

Greek Catholic cathedral in Przemyśl, Poland

Coordinates: 49°46′51″N 22°46′13″E

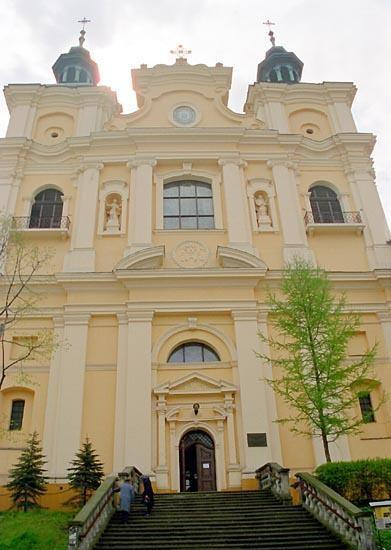
The facade of the Cathedral of St John the Baptist

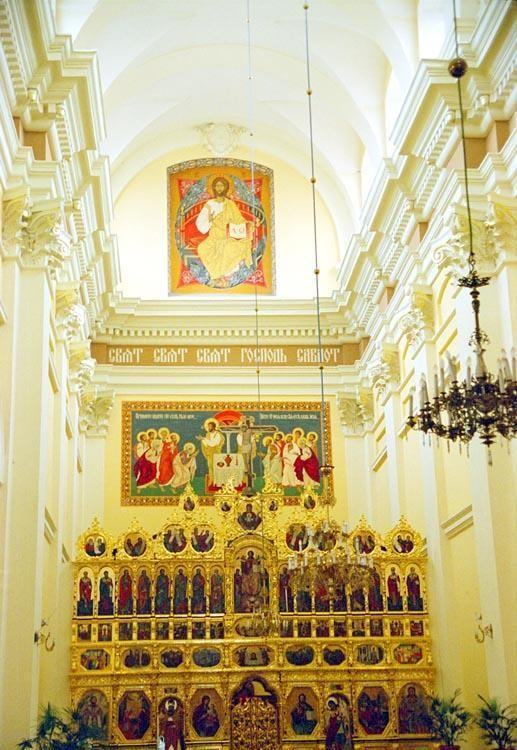
The interior of the Cathedral of St John the Baptist

The Greek Catholic Cathedral of St John the Baptist in Przemyśl serves as the mother church of the Ukrainian Greek Catholic Archeparchy of Peremyshl-Warsaw. It is located at the Ulica Katedralna in Przemyśl, in southern Poland.

The church was built in the 17th century by the Jesuit order and dedicated to St. Ignatius. After Przemyśl fell under Austrian rule and the suppression of the order in 1773 it slowly fell into ruins and in 1820 was closed by Austrians and turned into a storehouse. With the gradual democratization of region in the second half of the 19th century plans appeared to restore the church, finally carried out in 1903 and in 1904 the former Jesuit church was reconsecrated in 1904 as Sacred Heart of Jesus. After World War II it served as a garrison church and also offered a weekly Mass in the Byzantine Rite for Ukrainian Catholics whose church had been closed by the communist government.

In 1991 the church was subject of a controversy, when the Latin Catholic Church (with personal oversight by pope John Paul II) decided to donate the building to the Greek Catholic population in Przemyśl, to serve as the cathedral of the Archeparchy of Peremyshl-Warsaw in place of the Carmelite Church, which after World War II has returned to the Carmelites. After this decision, local Polish nationalists blockaded the entrance to the Greek Catholics and organized a hunger strike. After several weeks of debate and negotiation they desisted.

== See also ==
- List of Jesuit sites
