= Galleazzo Appiani =

Italian architect

Galleazzo Appiani was an Italian architect who worked in Poland. Amongst his designs are the Carmelite Church in Przemyśl and the Krasicki Palace, built between 1592 and 1618 for the Krasicki family in Krasiczyn.
