= Krasiczyn =

- Village
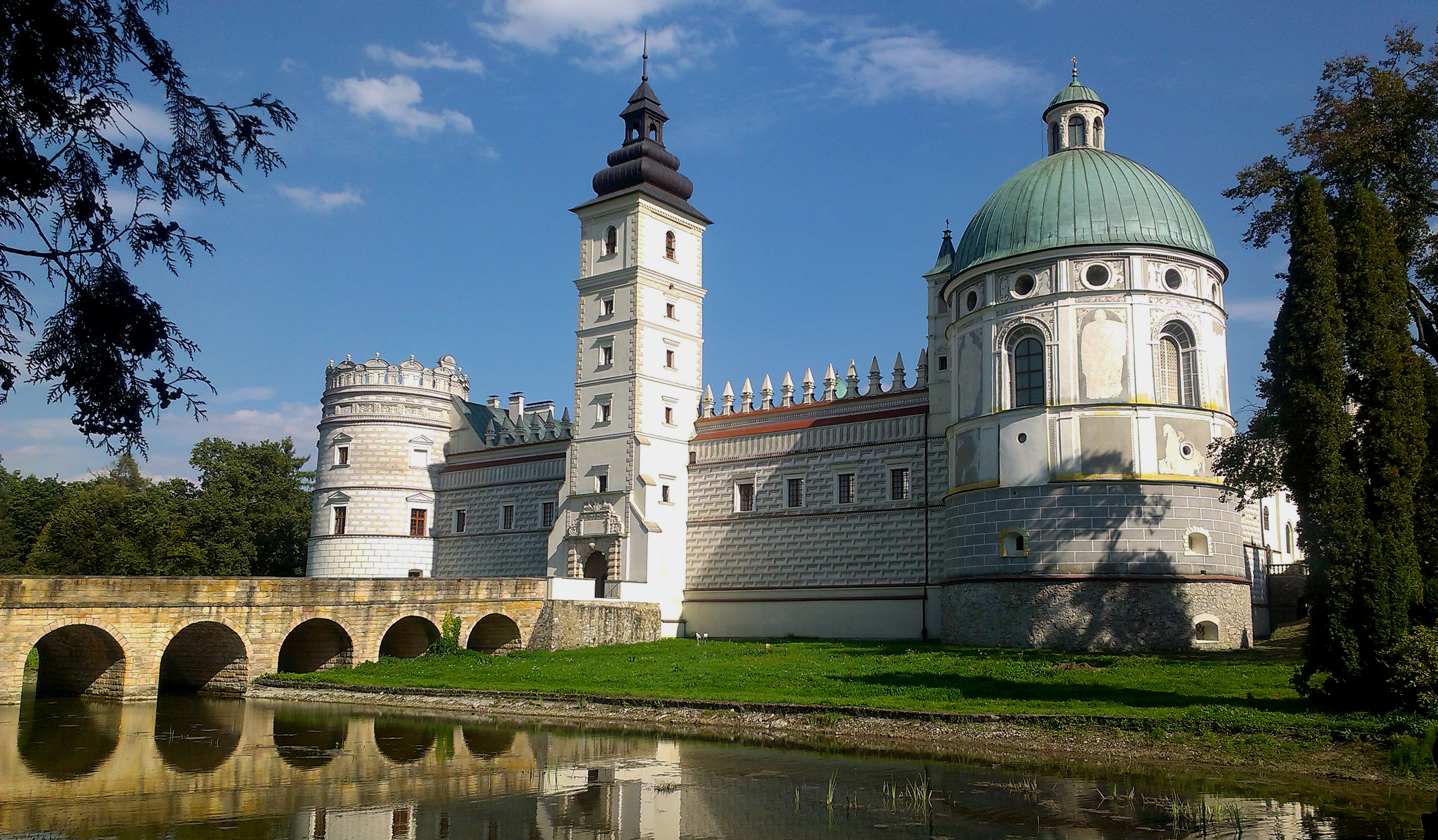
- Krasicki Palace in Krasiczyn

- Coat of arms

- Location within Poland
- Coordinates: 49°46′N 22°40′E
- Country: Poland
- Voivodeship: Subcarpathian
- County: Przemyśl
- Gmina: Krasiczyn
- Population: 440

Krasiczyn (Polish: [kraˈɕit͡ʂɨn]) is a village in Przemyśl County, Subcarpathian Voivodeship, in south-eastern Poland. It is the seat of the gmina (administrative district) called Gmina Krasiczyn.

In Krasiczyn stands the Krasicki Palace, a Renaissance palace built for Stanisław Krasicki by Galleazzo Appiani.

Adam Stefan Sapieha, a cardinal whom Pope John Paul II described as 'my model', was born in Krasiczyn, in the castle.

== History ==
As a result of the first of Partitions of Poland (Treaty of St-Petersburg dated 5 July 1772), the Galicia area was attributed to the Habsburg Monarchy. When a postoffice was opened in 1869, the town was in the Przemyśl Bezirkshauptmannschaft.

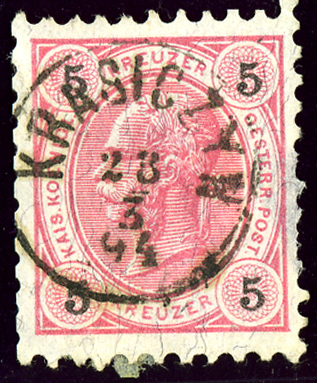
Austrian KK 5 kreuzer stamp, cancelled in 1894 at Krasiczyn

For more details, see the article Kingdom of Galicia and Lodomeria.
