= Hodyc coat of arms =

Polish coat of arms

Hodyc
- Alternative names: Hoditz, Hodicki
- Families: Hodycki, Hodytz

Hodyc is a Polish coat of arms. It was used by several szlachta families in the times of the Polish–Lithuanian Commonwealth.

== Notable bearers ==
Notable bearers of this coat of arms include:

== See also ==
- Heraldry
- List of Polish nobility coats of arms

== Sources ==
- Dynastic Genealogy
- Ornatowski.com
