= Krasicki =

Polish noble family

Coat of arms of Krasicki family

Krasicki (plural: Krasiccy, feminine form: Krasicka) was a Polish noble family first mentioned in the 15th century. Many Krasiccy were magnates in the First Republic of Poland.

== History ==
The family originated from Masovia. Their family nest was Siecień, and they initially went by the name Siecieński (z Siecina). On 1 July 1631, one branch of the family was elevated to the title of the Imperial Count by Ferdinand II. On March 14, 1786 members of the untitled branch, namely Antoni, Gabriel and Stanisław Krasicki of the Rogala coat of arms, were granted the title of Count in Galicia with the predicate Hoch- und wohlgeboren ( High-born and noble ), based on their blood relation to Ignacy Krasicki.

== Notable members ==
- August Krasicki
- Jan Boży Krasicki
- Karol Aleksander Krasicki
- Ksawery Franciszek Krasicki
- Ignacy Krasicki

== Residences ==
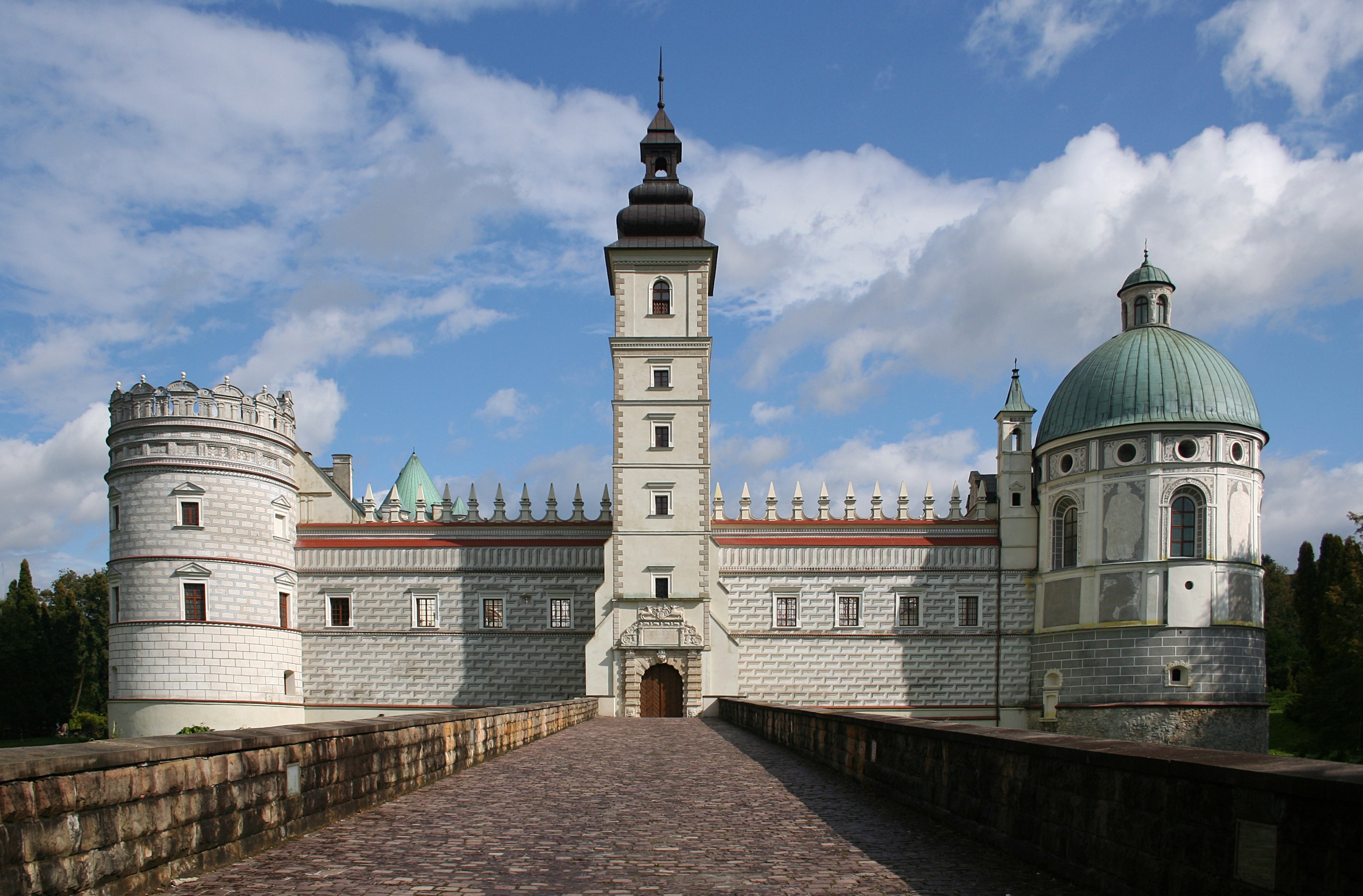
Krasiczyn Castle

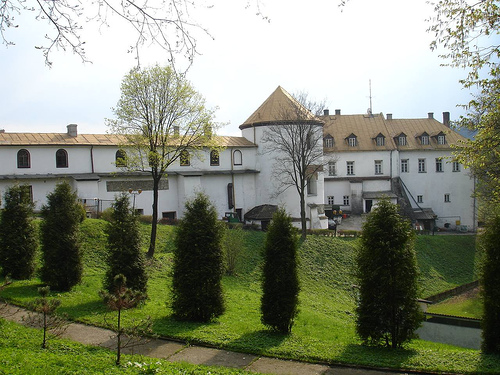
Castle in Lesko

== Gallery ==
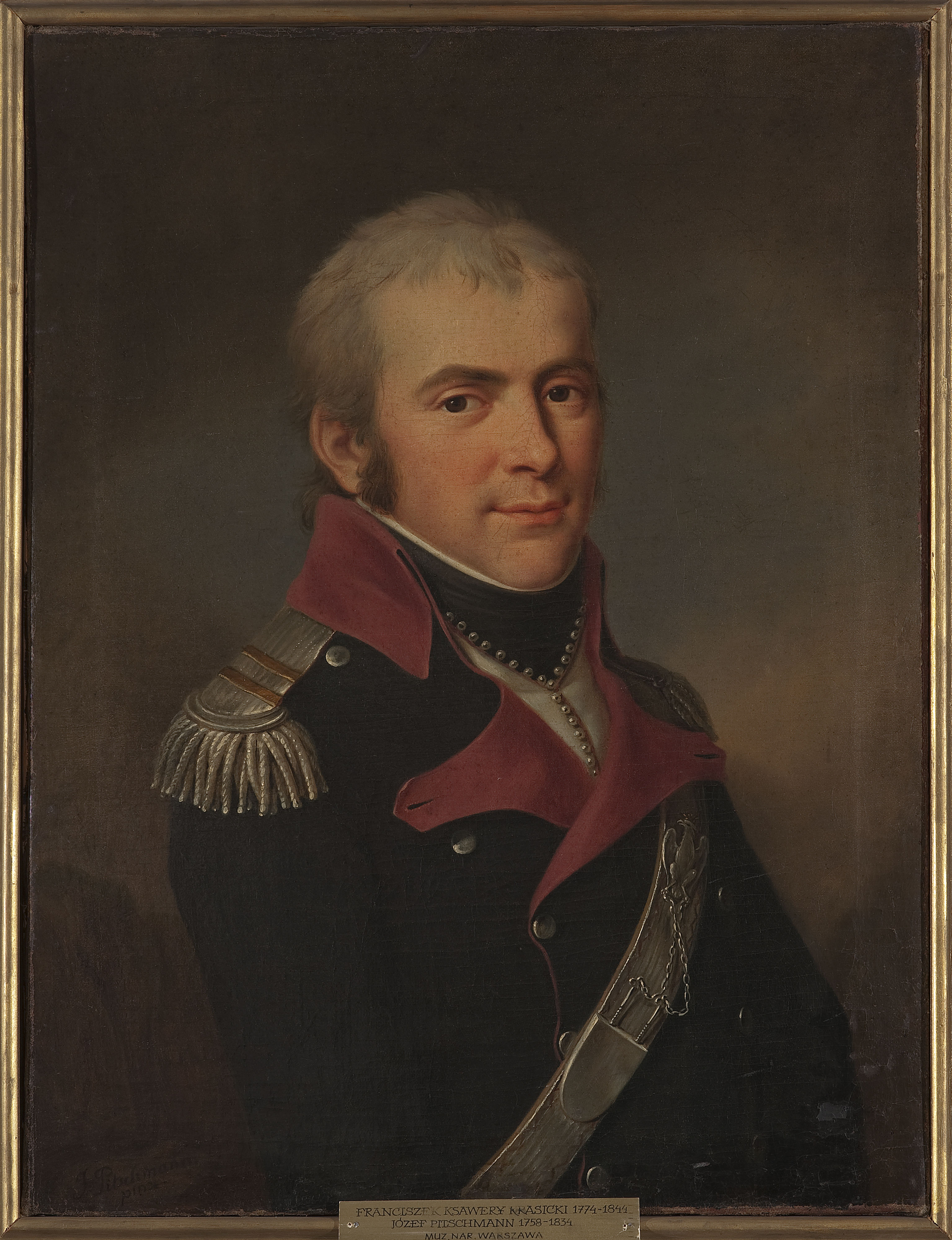
Ksawery Franciszek Krasicki

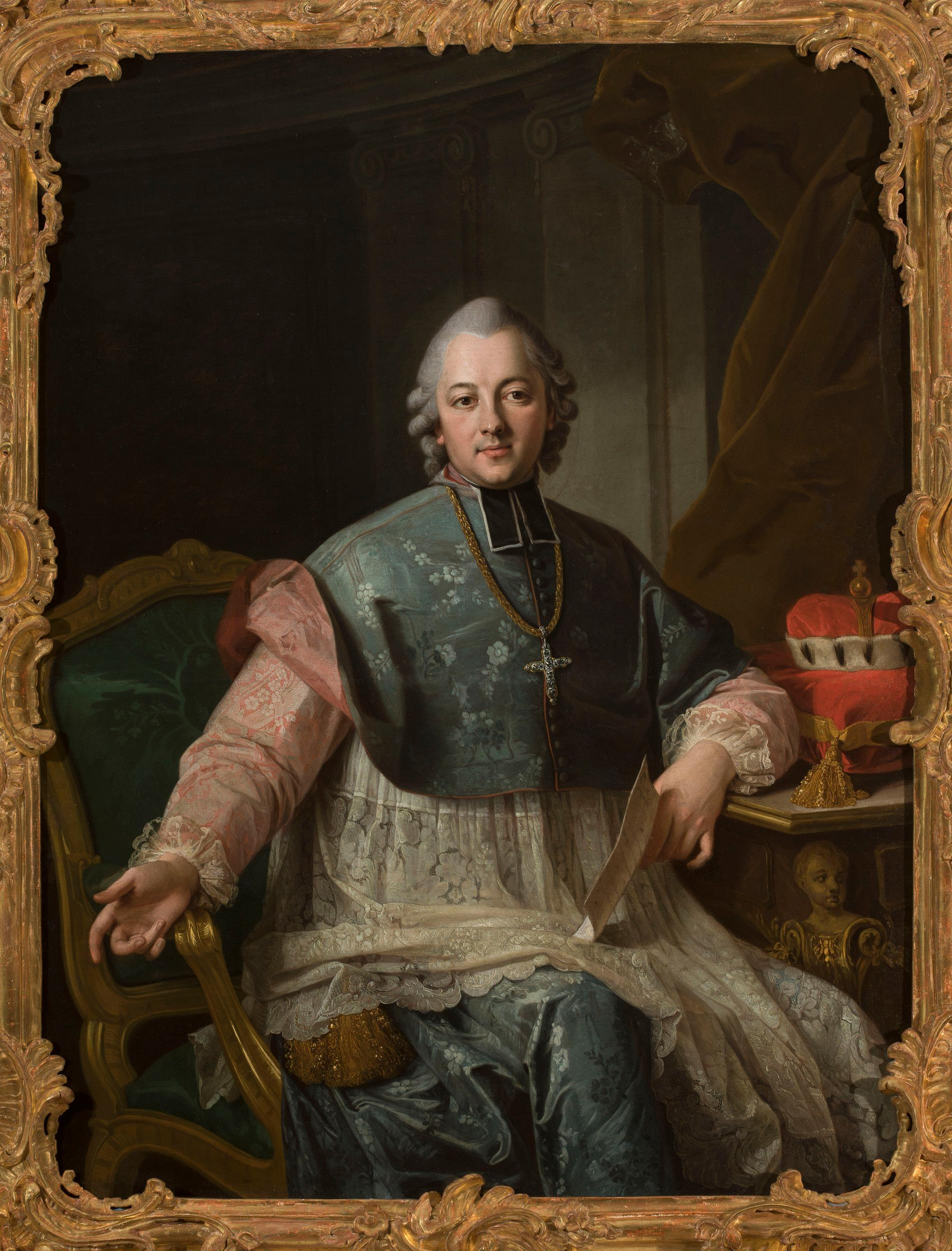
Primate of Poland Ignacy Krasicki

== See also ==
- Fables and Parables

== Bibliography ==
- T. 5: Oświecenie. W: Bibliografia Literatury Polskiej – Nowy Korbut. Warszawa: Państwowy Instytut Wydawniczy, 1967, s. 185–216.
- Polski Słownik Biograficzny t. 15 s. 144
- Andrzej Romaniak, Ostatni obrońca sanockiego zamku, Tygodnik Sanocki, nr 33 (719) z 19 sierpnia 2005, s 11.
