= Krasiczyn Castle =

Coordinates: 49°46′32″N 22°38′58″E

Krasiczyn Castle Zamek w Krasiczynie (in Polish)
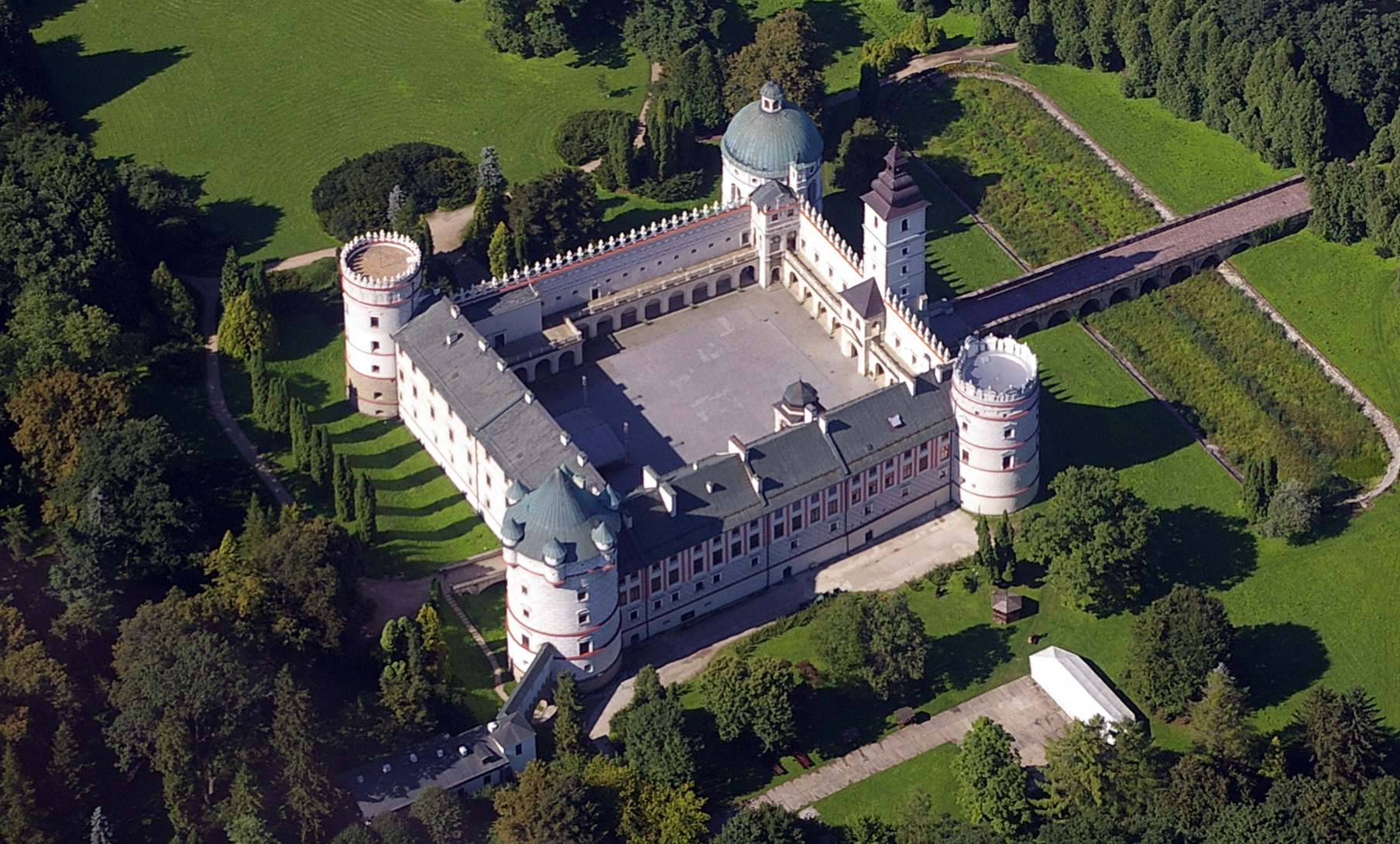
- Aerial view of the complex

General information
- Architectural style: Polish Mannerism
- Location: Krasiczyn, Poland
- Construction started: 1580
- Completed: 1631

Design and construction
- Architect: Galleazzo Appiani

Historic Monument of Poland
- Designated: 2018-04-20
- Reference no.: Dz. U. z 2018 r. poz. 988

Krasiczyn Castle (Polish: Zamek w Krasiczynie) is a Renaissance castle à la fortezza in Krasiczyn, southeastern Poland. It stands on a lowland at the right bank of the San River, along the Przemyśl-Sanok route and some 10 kilometres southwest of Przemyśl.

Across the centuries, the castle has belonged to several noble Polish families, and was visited by many Polish kings.

Together with a picturesque garden, it now belongs to the Industrial Development Agency (Polish: Agencja Rozwoju Przemyslu S.A.).

== History ==
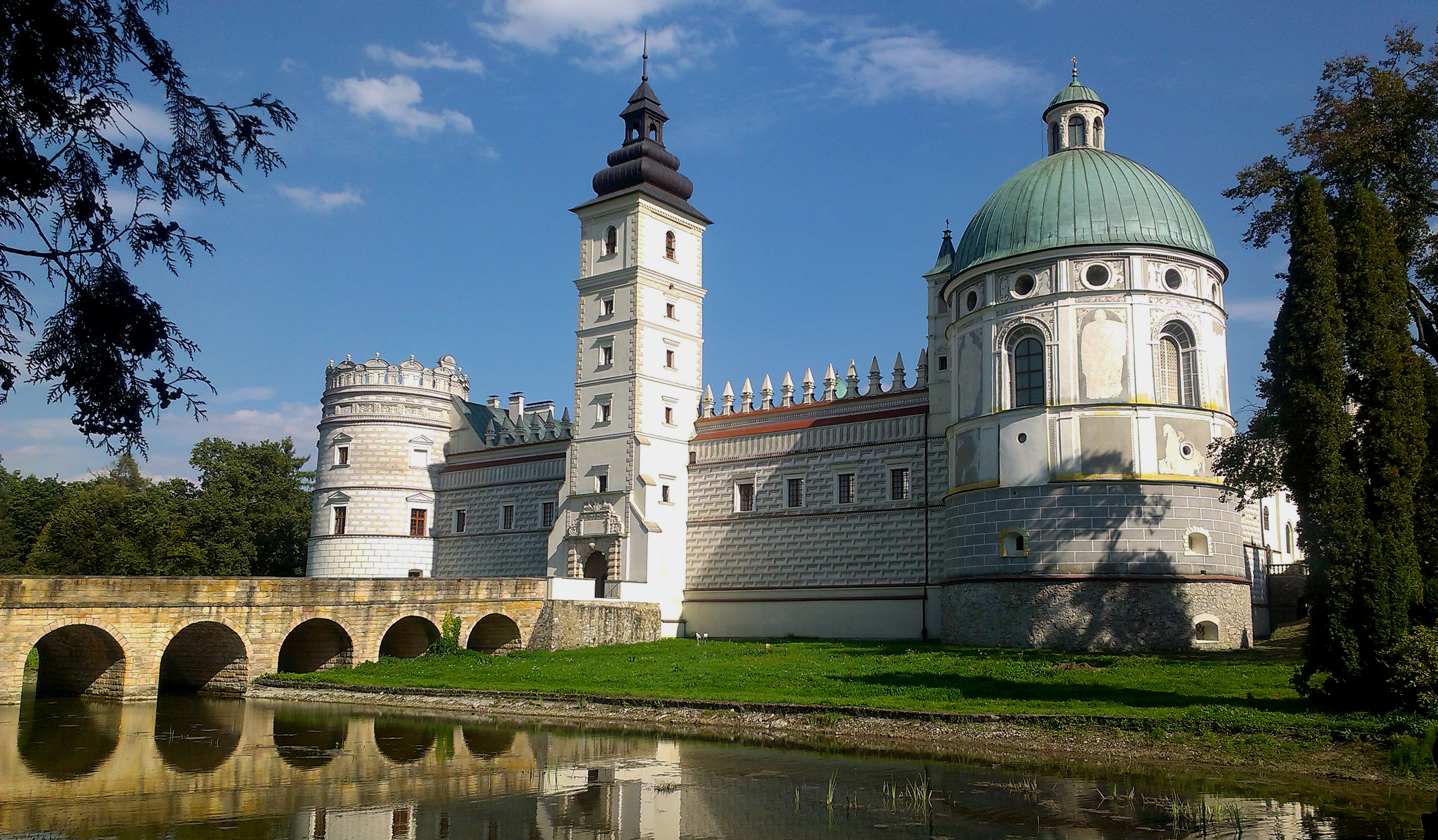
Front view of the castle and bridge

The construction of the castle started in 1580, initiated by the local nobleman Stanislaw Siecienski of Siecin, who came to the area from Mazovia. Construction lasted for 53 years, and the castle was not completed until 1633, by Marcin Krasicki, son of Stanisław and Voivode of Podolia, who in the meantime had changed his name. Originally, the castle was a fortified stronghold, protecting the southern border of the Polish–Lithuanian Commonwealth. However, Marcin Krasicki, who was regarded as one of the most important promoters of arts in the country, turned the fortress into a sophisticated residence (palazzo in fortezza), under the supervision of the Italian architect, Galleazzo Appiani. Also, he dubbed the complex Krasiczyn, after his last name. Later, a village of Krasiczyn grew near the castle, also bearing the same name. The Krasiczyn castle was built on the site of an older, wooden complex, called Sliwnica, which had probably been built in the 14th century.

Despite numerous fires and wars across the centuries, the castle's complex has been essentially unchanged since the early 17th century. Built as a square, with walls representing all four quarters of the globe, at the corners there are four oval-shaped towers: Divine (Boska), Papal (Papieska), Royal (Krolewska), and Noble (Szlachecka). These names reflected the eternal order of the world, with four grades of authority. The rectangular, spacious court is surrounded to the east and north by living quarters, and to the south and west by walls, adorned with attics. In the middle of the western wall, there is a square-shaped tower of the clock (Zegarowa), added by Marcin Krasicki at the beginning of the 17th century. This tower serves as a main gate, with a wall bridge over the moat. Across the centuries, the castle attracted the most famous personalities of Polish history. Among visitors, there were kings Sigismund III Vasa, Wladyslaw IV Vasa, John II Casimir Vasa, and Augustus II the Strong. Sigismund III Vasa, of whom Marcin Krasicki was a loyal supporter, visited the castle thrice. For the first time, in 1608, together with his wife Constance of Austria.

== Architecture ==
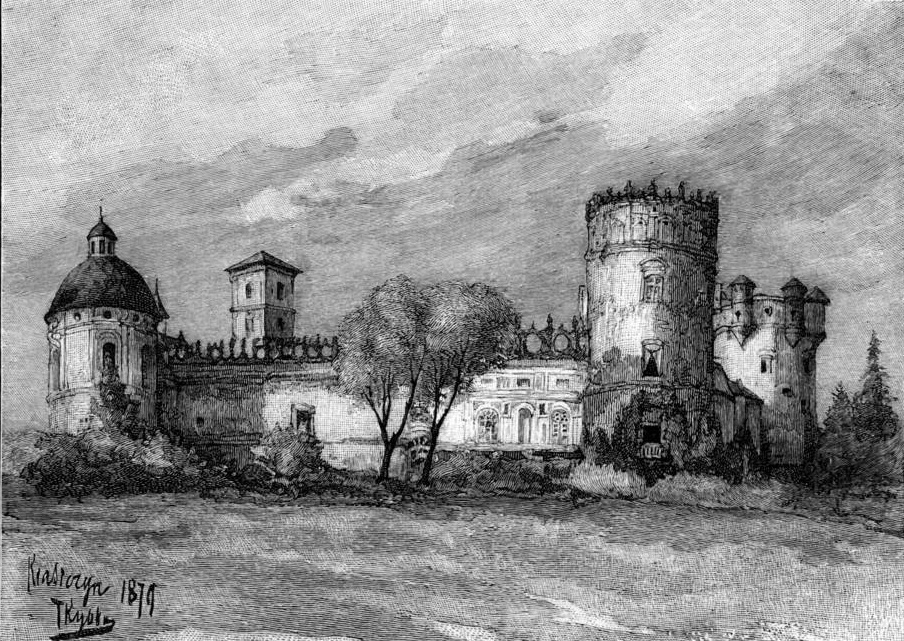
The castle in the 19th century

One of the most precious elements of the complex is the chapel, located in the Divine Tower, which has been compared to the Sigismund's Chapel in Kraków's Wawel Cathedral. Among other interesting things, there are richly sculpted portals, loggias, arcades, and unique sgraffito wall decorations, whose total area is about 7000 square meters. All works were overseen by Italian architects, and the details were completed by craftsmen from nearby Przemysl. The sgraffito depicted Roman emperors, Polish kings, members of the Krasicki family, hunting scenes, and saints of the Roman-Catholic Church. Unfortunately, most of the interior design has been destroyed, mostly by the Red Army soldiers, who were stationed there from October 1939 to June 1941 (see: Polish September Campaign, Operation Barbarossa).

Near the castle, there is the Swiss Pavilion, connected with Krasiczyn by a secret passage. Standing also in the adjacent park is the Hunter’s Pavilion, a villa in "the hunter style". The park itself is abundant with birds and plants.

== Owners ==
After Krasicki family died out in late 17th century, the complex was inherited by Urszula Modrzewska. Then it belonged to several other families: Wojakowscy, Tarłowie (since 1724), Potoccy (since 1751), Pinińscy (since 1785). Finally, in 1835, the castle was purchased by prince Leon Sapieha, and his family owned the complex until 1944 (with the exception of the Soviet occupation in 1939–1941), when Communist government of Poland nationalized it. The Sapieha family invested plenty of money in the castle. They remodelled it, with the help of Engerth, an architect from Vienna, founded a sawmill, a brewery, and a small factory of farmers’ appliances. They actively promoted economic development of the whole area. On 3 May 1852, a great fire destroyed most of the complex, except for the chapel, and it took several years to repair the damages. In 1867, one of the most important personalities of Polish Catholic Church, Cardinal Adam Stefan Sapieha was born here.

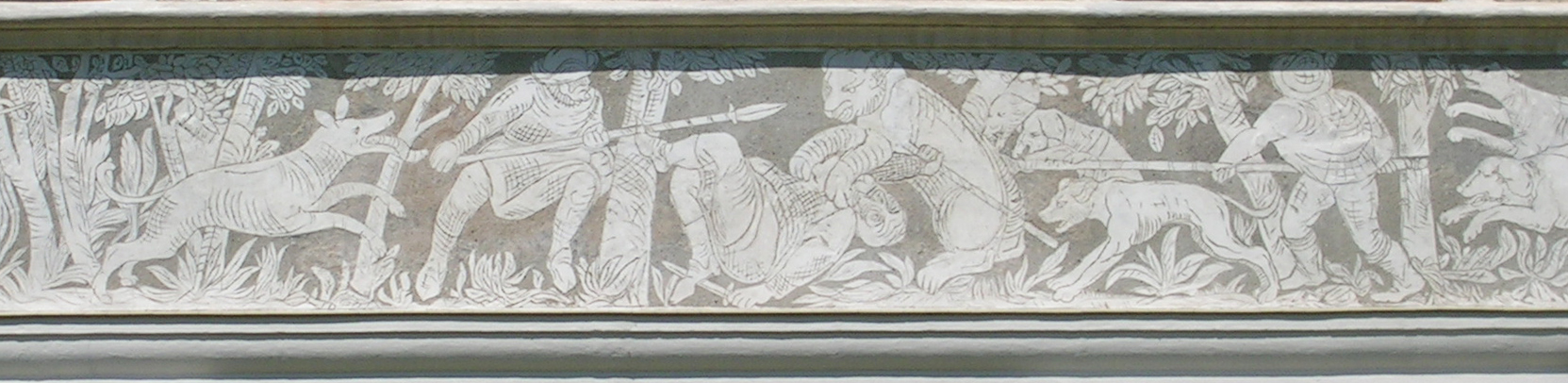
Hunting scene - mannerist sgraffito on outer wall of the Krasiczyn Castle

In late 1941, after German invasion of Soviet Union, Andrzej Sapieha returned to the castle, which had been used as barracks for soldiers of the Red Army (see Molotov Line). This is his account of the premises: “On the floors there is garbage, old clothes, destroyed books. Walls full of Soviet propaganda posters, no furniture, instead of it, wooden beds everywhere. The chapel is completely ruined, all sculptures on the walls destroyed as high as the savages could reach. Altars and pews destroyed. All three monuments have disappeared. The church in a terrible state, as it had been used as stables and a butcher shop. Metal coffins were used by the Bolsheviks as bathtubs”.

== Currently ==
After World War II, the Communist government nationalized the complex and set up a high school of forestry in the buildings. In the 1970s, the castle was a property of automobile manufacturer from Warsaw. After the collapse of the Communist system, the castle found a new owner, Warsaw's Industrial Development Agency (Agencja Rozwoju Przemysłu S.A.), which has carried out extensive renovation of the complex. As a result, in 2000, Krasiczyn was added to the association of hotels and restaurants located in historic buildings (European Castle Hotels & Restaurants). (The hotel is located in a side wing of the castle). Currently, Krasiczyn castle is a popular tourist attraction and there are organized sightseeing tours held here.

Renovation has significantly slowed down due to the COVID-19 pandemic and the ongoing war in Ukraine. There is a significant lack of funding as tourists numbers dwindle due to the ongoing crisis in Ukraine. The next pieces of the renovation plan include buying large organ for the chapel, and finishing the interior of the castle. The only furniture left in the castle after the Soviet occupation was within the Prince’s private office spaces. The Prince’s personal butler built brick walls blocking off and hiding this space from the Soviets. In this collection included a large amount of animal head taxidermy, all of which were personally hunted by the Prince in Africa, they are now displayed on the walls in the castle for tourists to enjoy.

== Gallery ==
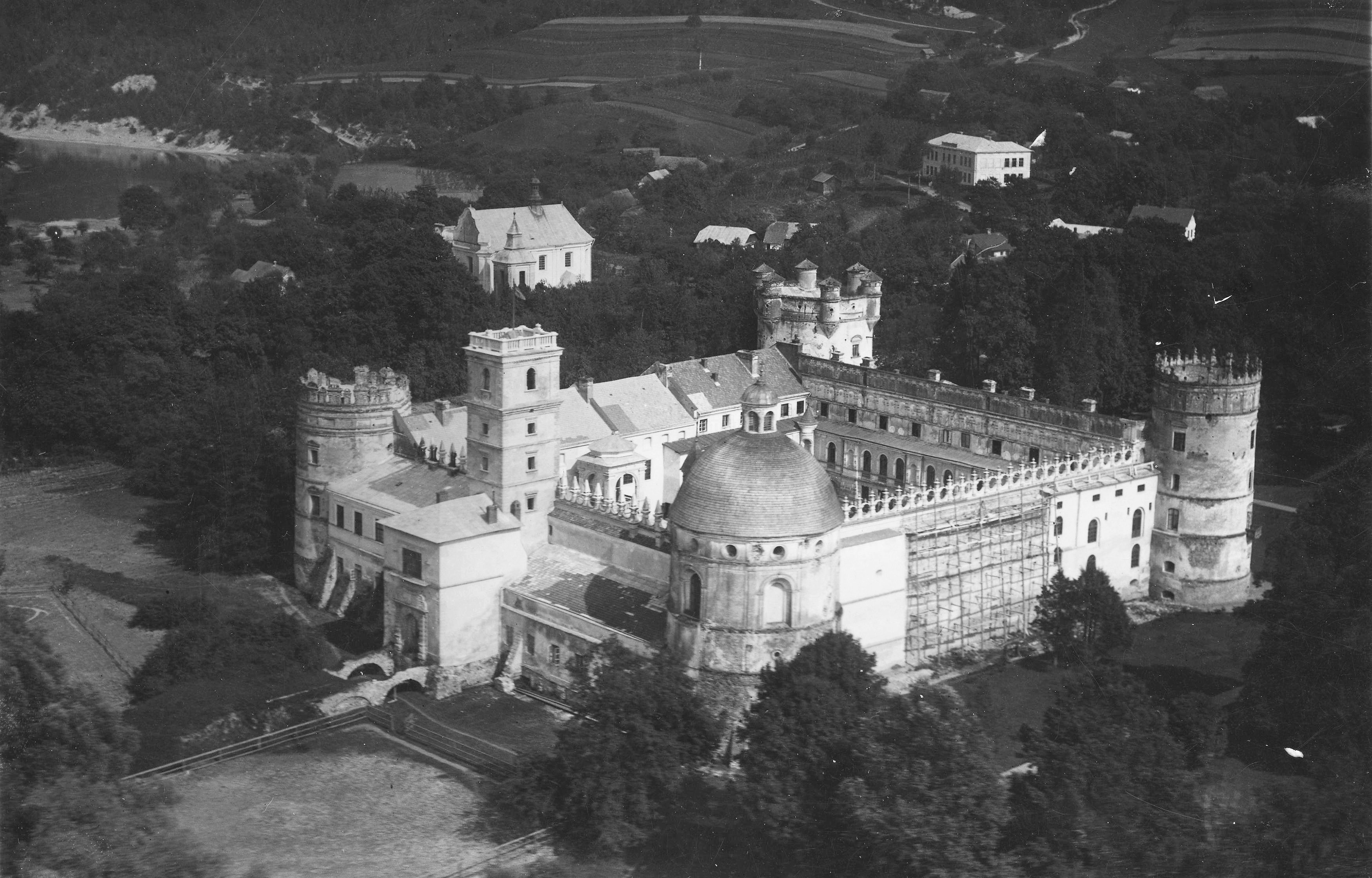
Krasiczyn Castle in 1939

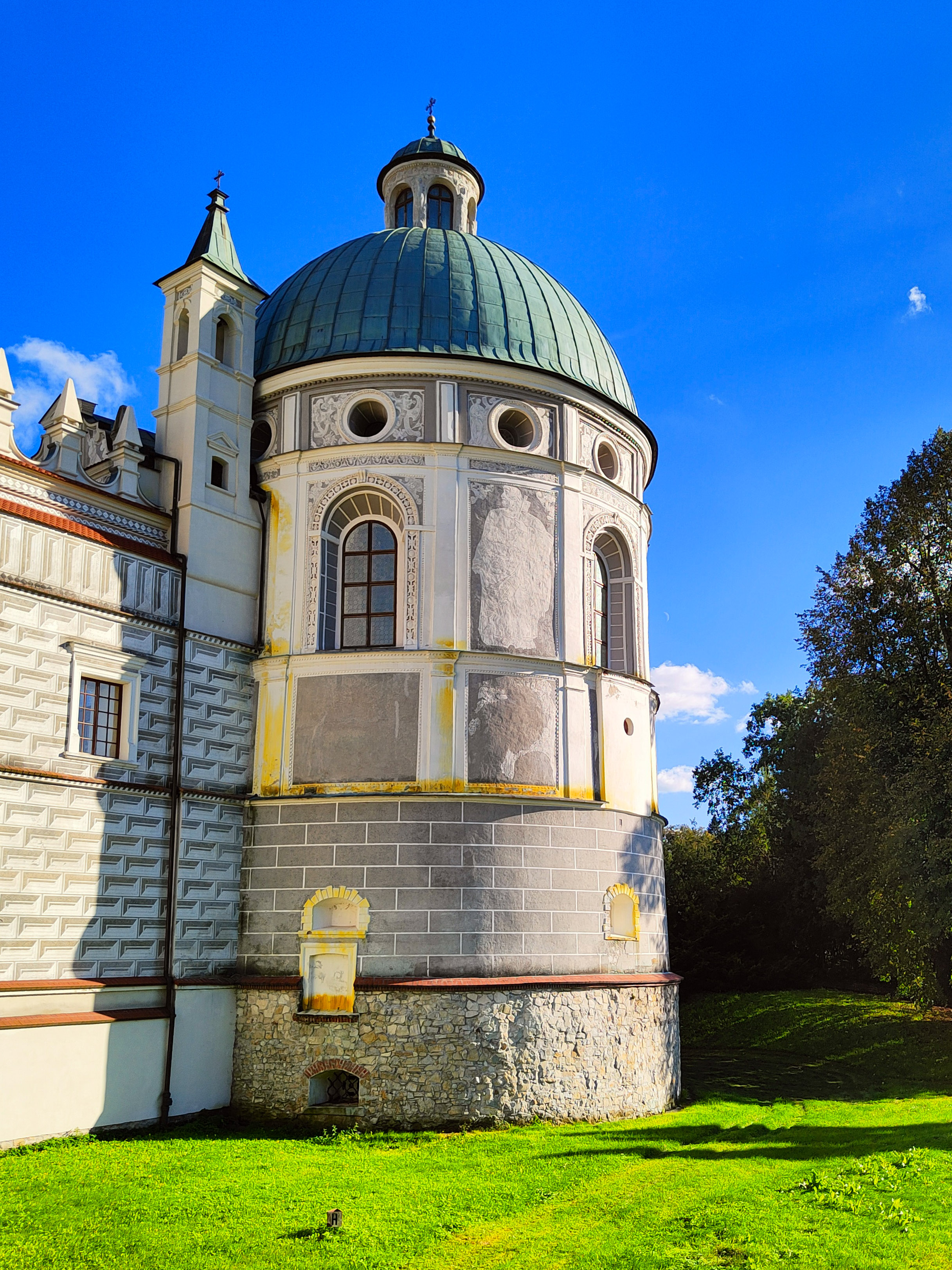
Divine Tower

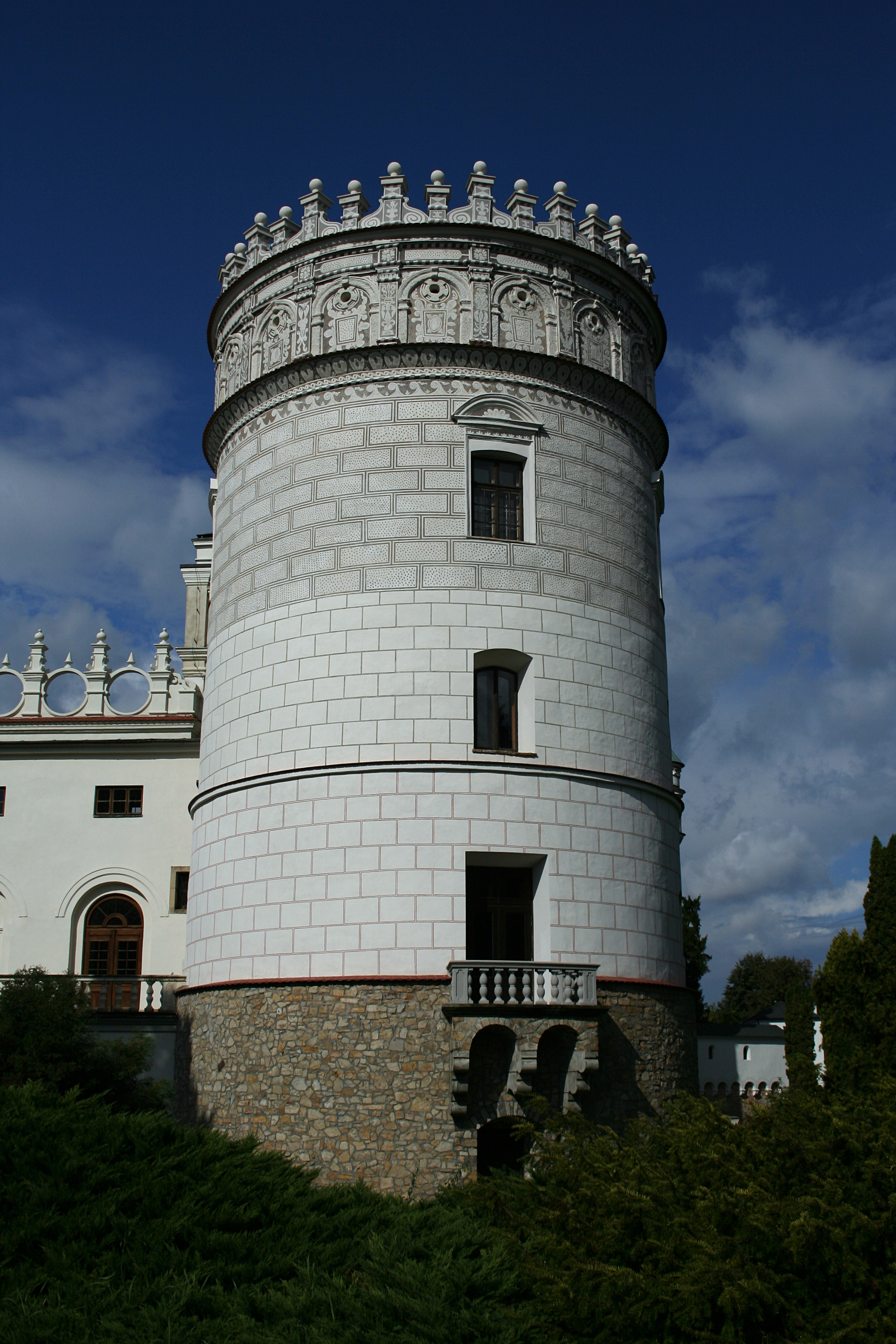
Noble Tower

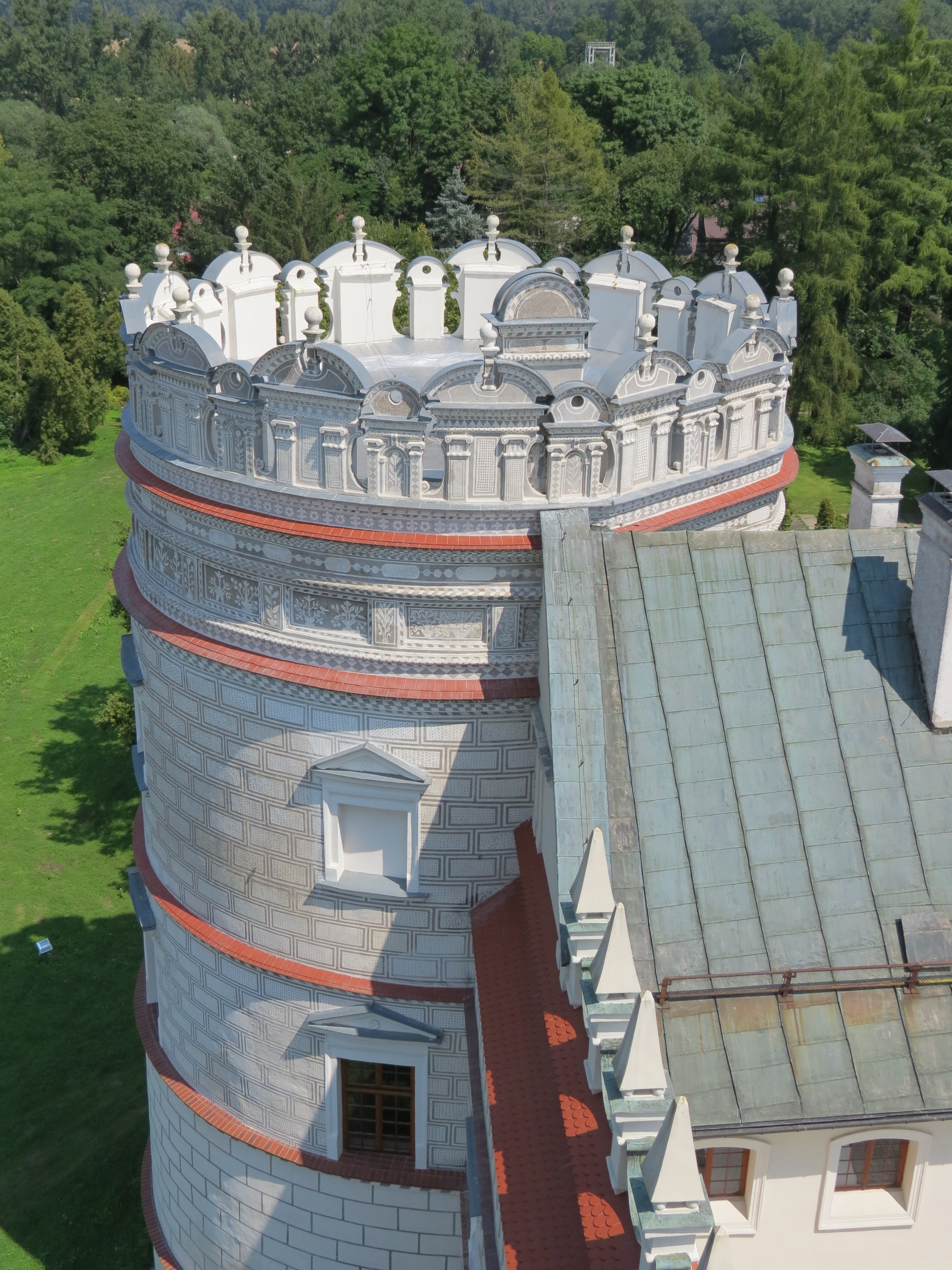
Papal Tower

Royal Tower

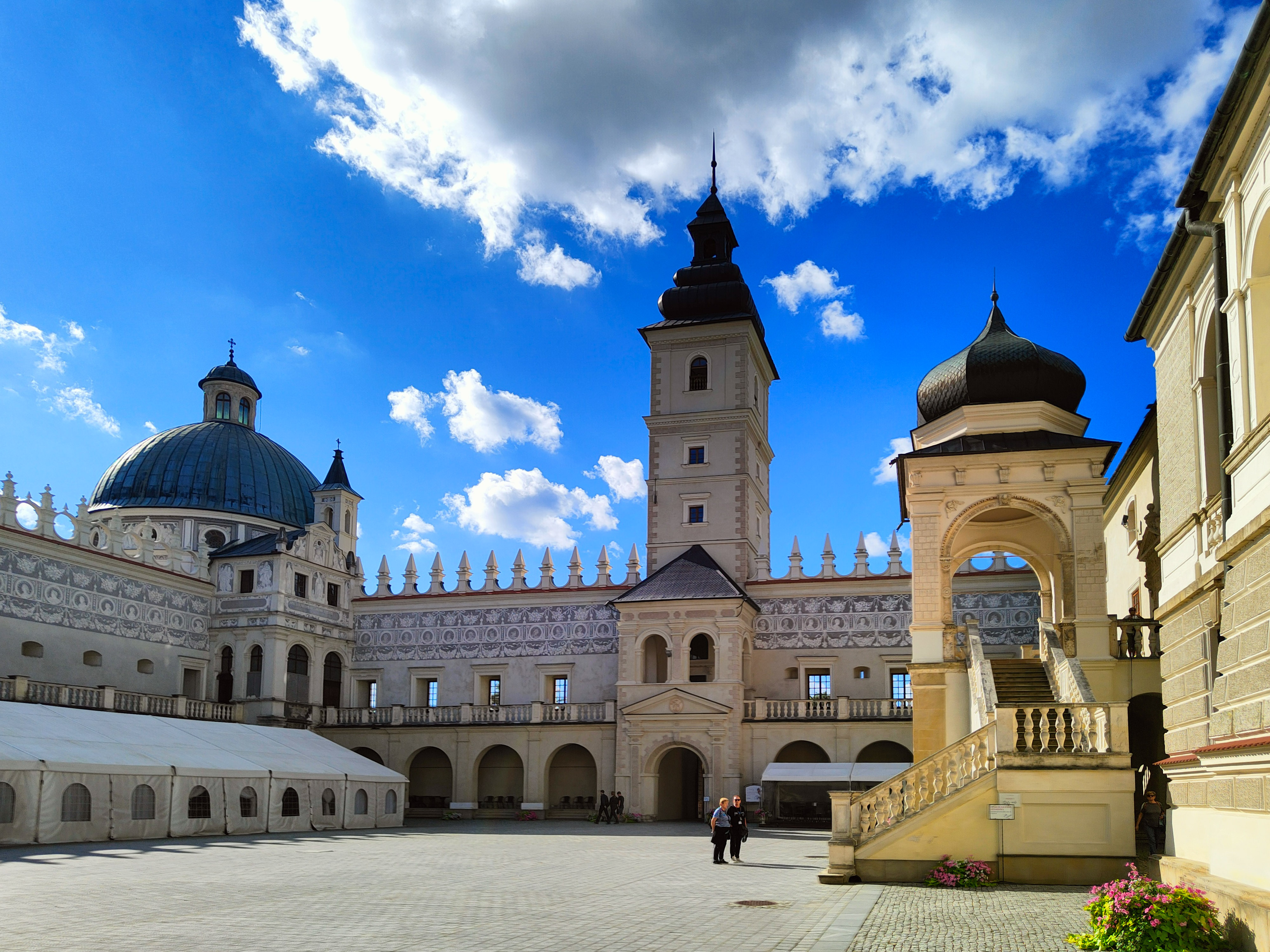
The castle's courtyard

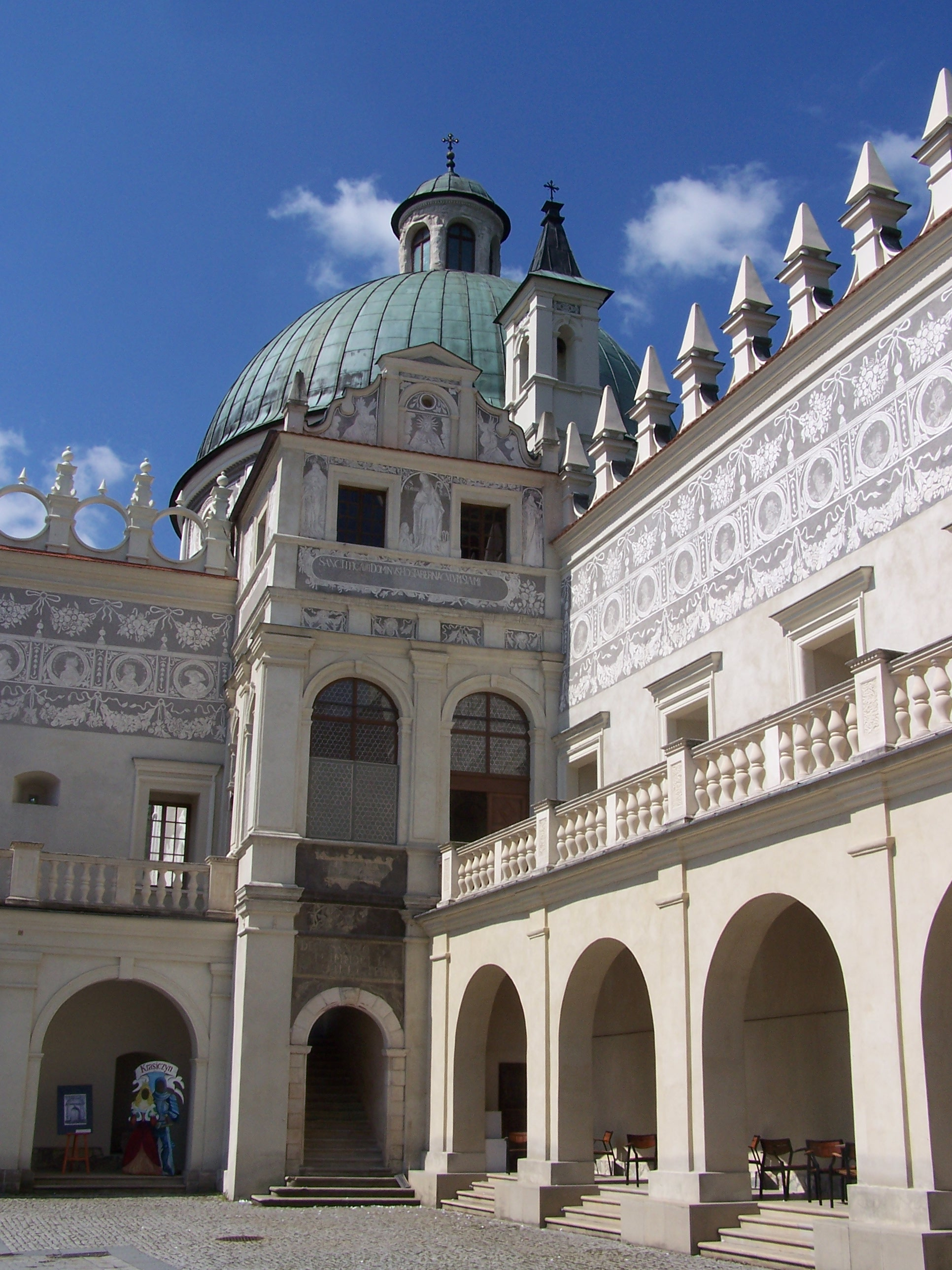
Italianate attic

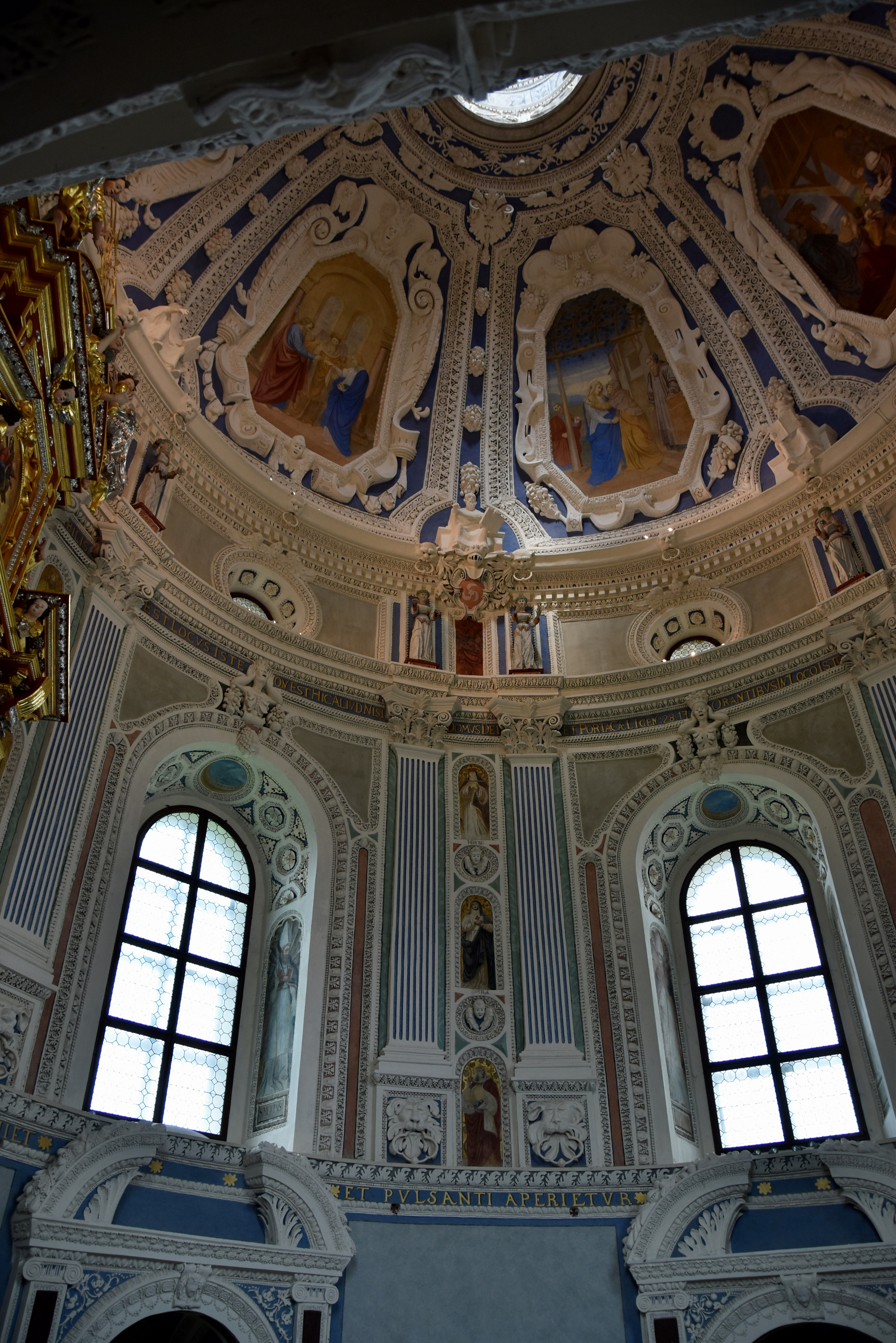
Interior

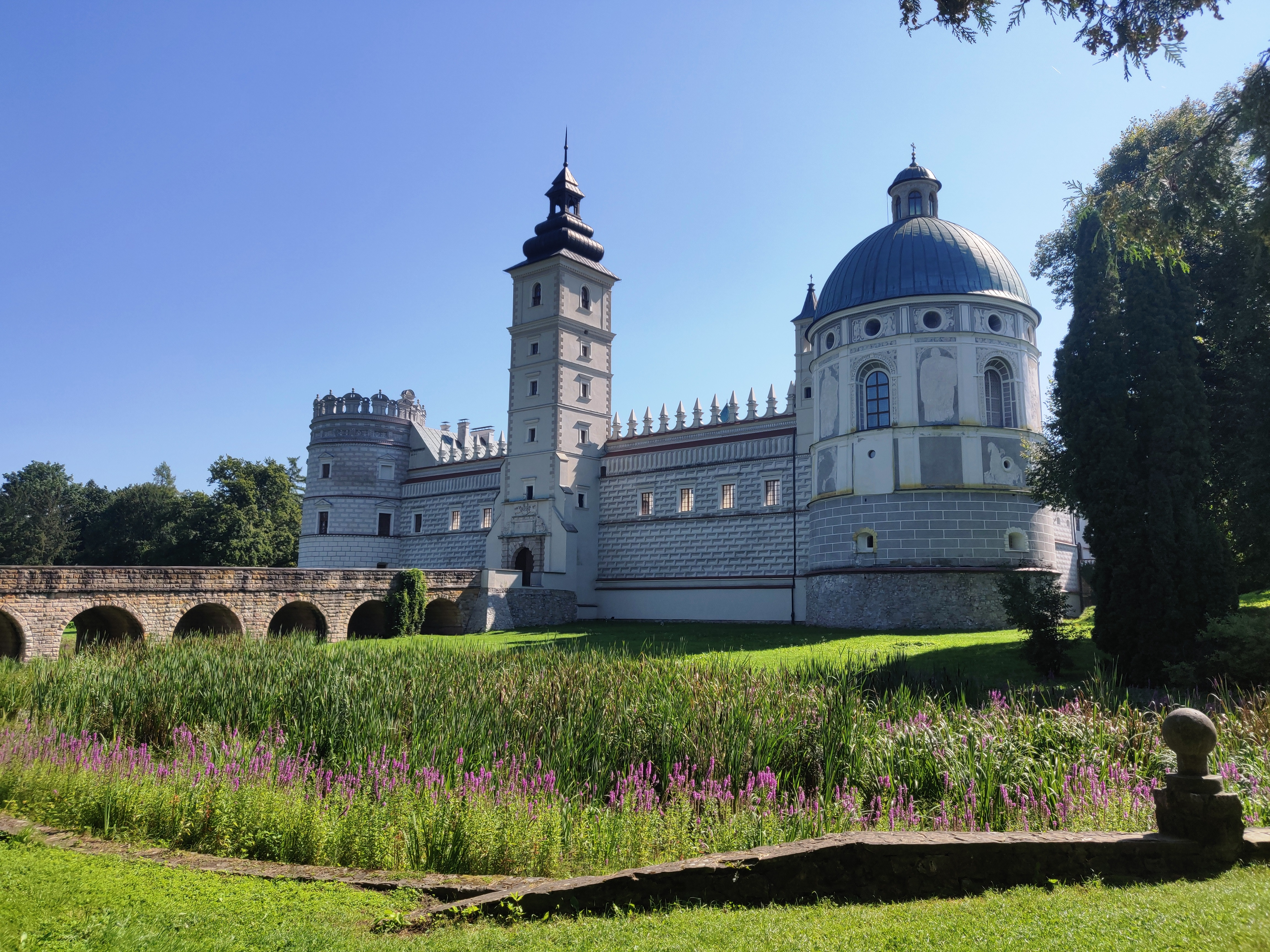
The castle and bridge

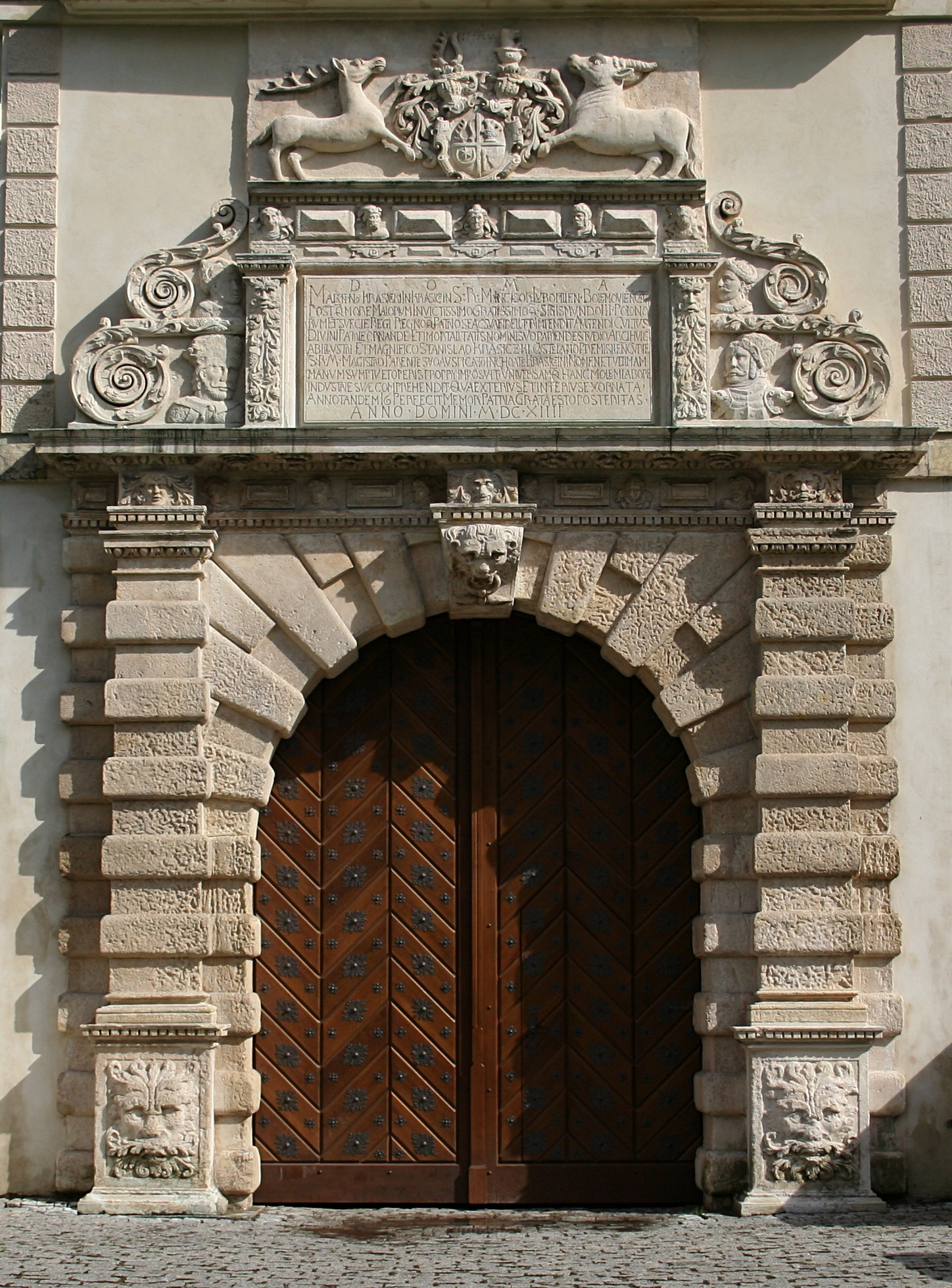
Main gate

== See also ==
- List of mannerist structures in Southern Poland
- Castles in Poland
