= Solonka =

Solonka is a name for multiple settlements in Eastern Europe. It may refer to one of the following:

- Sołonka, a village in Subcarpathian Voivodeship, Poland.
- Solonka, Volgograd Oblast, a village in Volgograd Oblast, Russia.
- Solonka, Ukraine, a village in Lviv Oblast, Ukraine.
