= Straszydle =

- Village
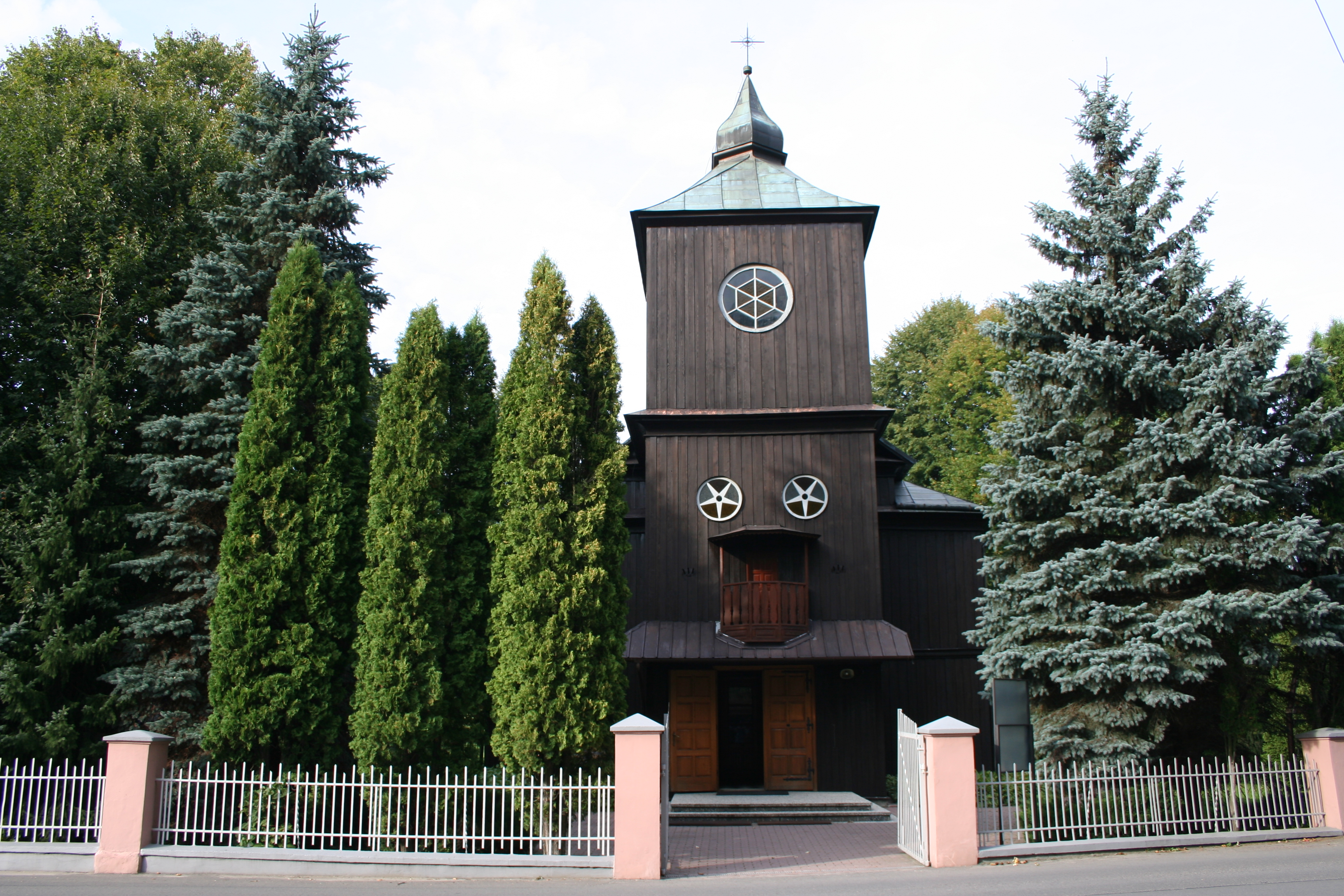
- Church of Our Lady of Perpetual Help in Straszydle

- Location within Poland
- Coordinates: 49°54′1″N 21°58′53″E
- Country: Poland
- Voivodeship: Subcarpathian
- County: Rzeszów
- Gmina: Lubenia

Population
  - Total: 2,077
- Time zone: UTC+1 (CET)
  - Summer (DST): UTC+2 (CEST)
- Vehicle registration: RZE

Straszydle [straˈʂɨdlɛ] is a village in the administrative district of Gmina Lubenia, within Rzeszów County, Subcarpathian Voivodeship, in south-eastern Poland.

== History ==
The settlement was founded at the beginning of the 15th century and was part of the royal estate of Władysław Jagiełło, then it was incorporated into the private lands of magnate families, the so-called State of Tyczyński. In 1450 the owner was Jan of Pilcza, the son of Elizabeth Granowska, the third wife of Władysław Jagiełło.

In 1770, during the cholera epidemic, more than half of the villagers died out.

The so-called "Magyar" route, connecting Hungary with Poland, which was used by merchant caravans already in the times of the Roman Empire, and during World War I, Austrian and Russian troops, taking part in the fights for the Przemyśl Fortress and the Battle of Gorlice, moved here. Currently, this trail has lost its importance in terms of communication due to unfavorable terrain and has become a scenic and cycling trail.

Four Polish citizens were murdered by Nazi Germany in the village during World War II.
