= Siedliska, Rzeszów County =

Siedliska
- Village
- Location within Poland
- Coordinates: 49°57′11″N 21°56′47″E
- Country: Poland
- Voivodeship: Podkarpackie
- County: Rzeszów
- Gmina: Lubenia
- Population: 1,700

Siedliska [ɕɛdˈlʲiska] is a village in the administrative district of Gmina Lubenia, within Rzeszów County, Podkarpackie Voivodeship, in south-eastern Poland.

== Notable personalities ==
Siedliska is the birthplace of Father Józef Kowalski of the Salesian Society, the martyr of Auschwitz concentration camp beatified by Pope John Paul II on June 13, 1999, at a ceremonial mass in Warsaw.
