= Siege of Przemyśl =

1914–15 battle on the Eastern Front of World War I

- Part of the Eastern Front of World War I
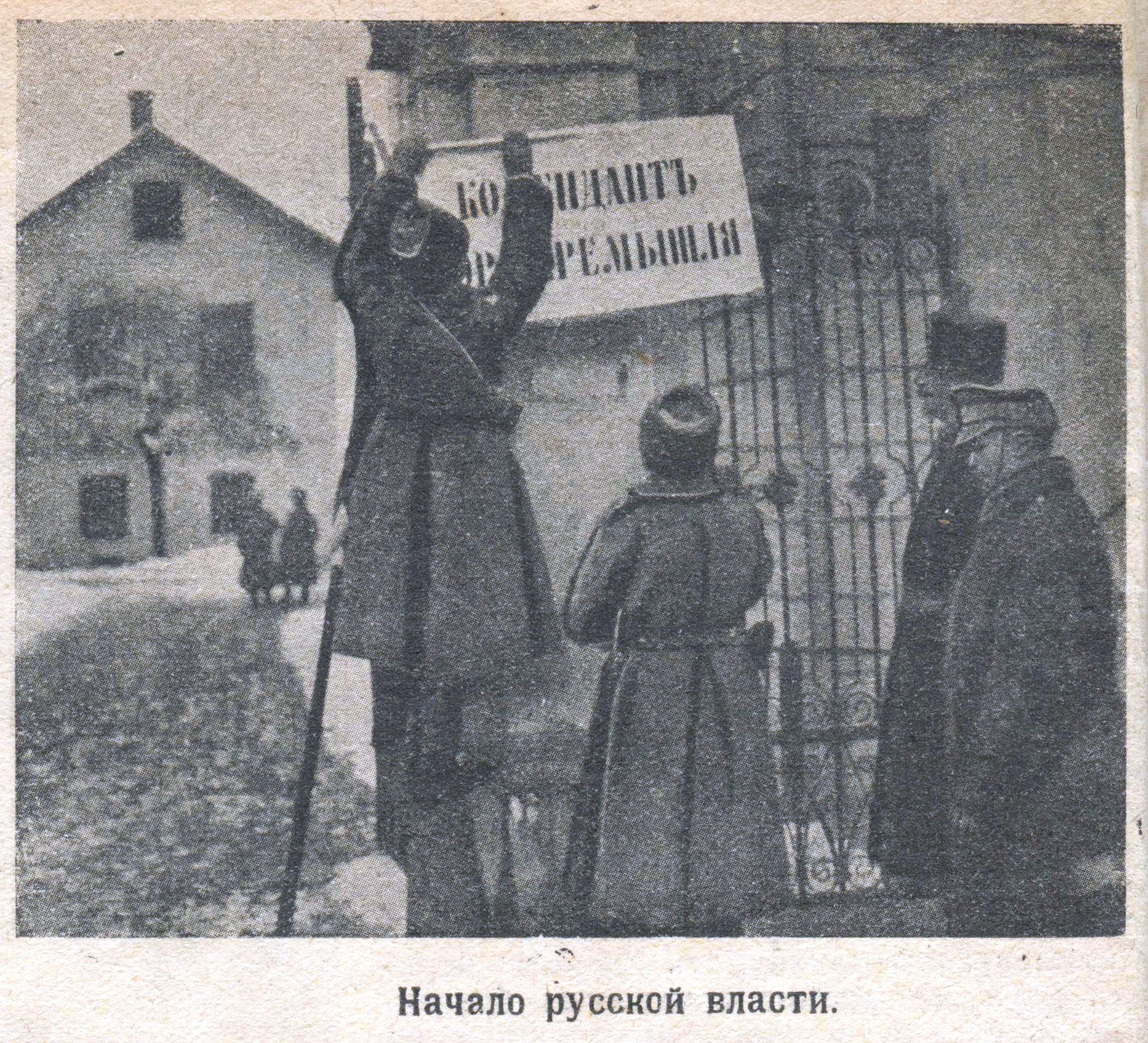
- Establishment of Russian power in Przemysl
Date	16 September 1914 – 22 March 1915 (6 months and 6 days)
Location	Przemyśl, Austria-Hungary (present-day Poland) 49°47′N 22°46′E
Result	Russian victory Full results: First Siege: Austro-Hungarian victory; Second siege: Russian victory

Belligerents
Austria-Hungary	Russian Empire

Commanders and leaders
(Austria-Hungary) Hermann Kusmanek (surrendered) (Austria-Hungary) Svetozar Boroević	Radko Dimitriev; Andrei Selivanov

Units involved
(Austria-Hungary) Przemyśl fortress garrison	3rd Army (Note: They did not take direct part in the siege and guarded the rear of the 11th Army); 11th Army

Strength
138,000 men: 93,000 soldiers 45,000 impressed levy	300,000 men

Casualties and losses
137,000; 20,000 dead 120,000 captured (including wounded); 700 artillery pieces 9 generals captured	115,000 total casualties (20,000–40,000 casualties were sustained in the first few days of the siege.)

The Siege of Przemyśl (Note: Polish: Oblężenie twierdzy Przemyśl; German: Belagerung von Premissel; Russian: Перемы́шльская осада) was the longest siege in Europe during the First World War, and the second-longest in the entire conflict, after the Siege of Medina. The siege was a crushing defeat of the Austro-Hungarian Army by the Russian Army. Przemyśl was a fortress-town and stronghold on the River San in Austrian Galicia. The investment of Przemyśl began on 16 September 1914 and was briefly suspended on 11 October, due to an Austro-Hungarian offensive. The siege resumed on 9 November and the Austro-Hungarian garrison surrendered on 22 March 1915, after holding out for a total of 133 days. The siege has been referred to as "Austria-Hungary's Stalingrad".

== Background ==
In August 1914, Russian armies moved against both German East Prussia and one of Austria-Hungary's largest provinces, Galicia, straddling the present-day border between Poland and Ukraine. Its advance into Germany was soon repelled but its Galician campaign was more successful. General Nikolai Ivanov overwhelmed the Austro-Hungarian forces under Conrad von Hötzendorf during the Battle of Galicia, and the whole Austrian front fell back over 160 kilometres (100 mi) to the Carpathian Mountains. The fortress at Przemyśl was the only Austrian post that held out and by 28 September, was completely behind Russian lines. The Russians were now in a position to threaten the German industrial region of Silesia, making the defence of Przemyśl of importance to the Germans as well as the Austro-Hungarians.

50 kilometres (30 mi) of new trenches were dug and 1,000 km (650 mi) of barbed wire were used to make seven new lines of defence around the perimeter of the town. Inside the fortress, a military garrison of 127,000, as well as 18,000 civilians, were surrounded by six Russian divisions. Przemyśl reflected the nature of the Austro-Hungarian Empire – orders of the day had to be issued in fifteen languages. Austrians, Poles, Jews and Ruthenians (Ukrainians) were together in the besieged town, that was hit constantly with artillery fire, and as the toll of the dead, sick and wounded rose, and starvation threatened, so did mutual distrust and ethnic tension.

== First siege ==
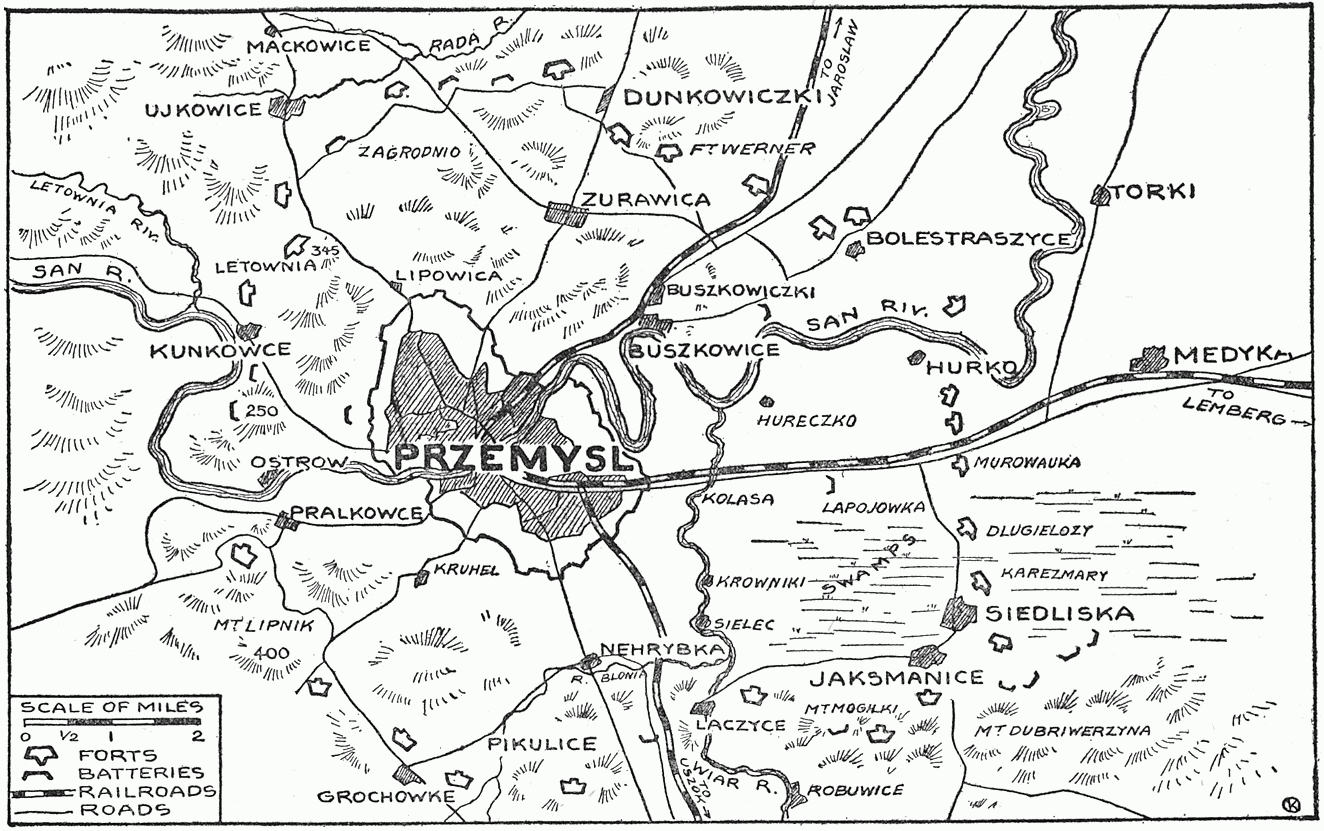
Map of Przemyśl and surrounding forts

On 24 September, General Radko Dimitriev, commander of the Russian Third Army began the siege of the fortress with six divisions. Dimitriev, after a brief artillery bombardment, ordered a full-scale assault on the fortress. The fortress was defended by 120,000 soldiers, under the command of Hermann Kusmanek von Burgneustädten. For three days the Russians attacked and accomplished nothing at the cost of 40,000 casualties.

During the Battle of the Vistula River, Svetozar Boroevic von Bojna's Third Army advanced towards Przemyśl. On 5 October, Russian assaults continued, under the command of General Scherbakov, including a major one on 7 October. Yet, with Austro-Hungarian forces advancing, the Russian assault was discontinued. On 9 October, a cavalry unit from the Third Army entered the besieged fortress, and the main body on 12 Oct.

== Second siege ==
A contemporary German illustration of the second Siege of Przemyśl, published in the Illustrated War News on 13 January 1915.

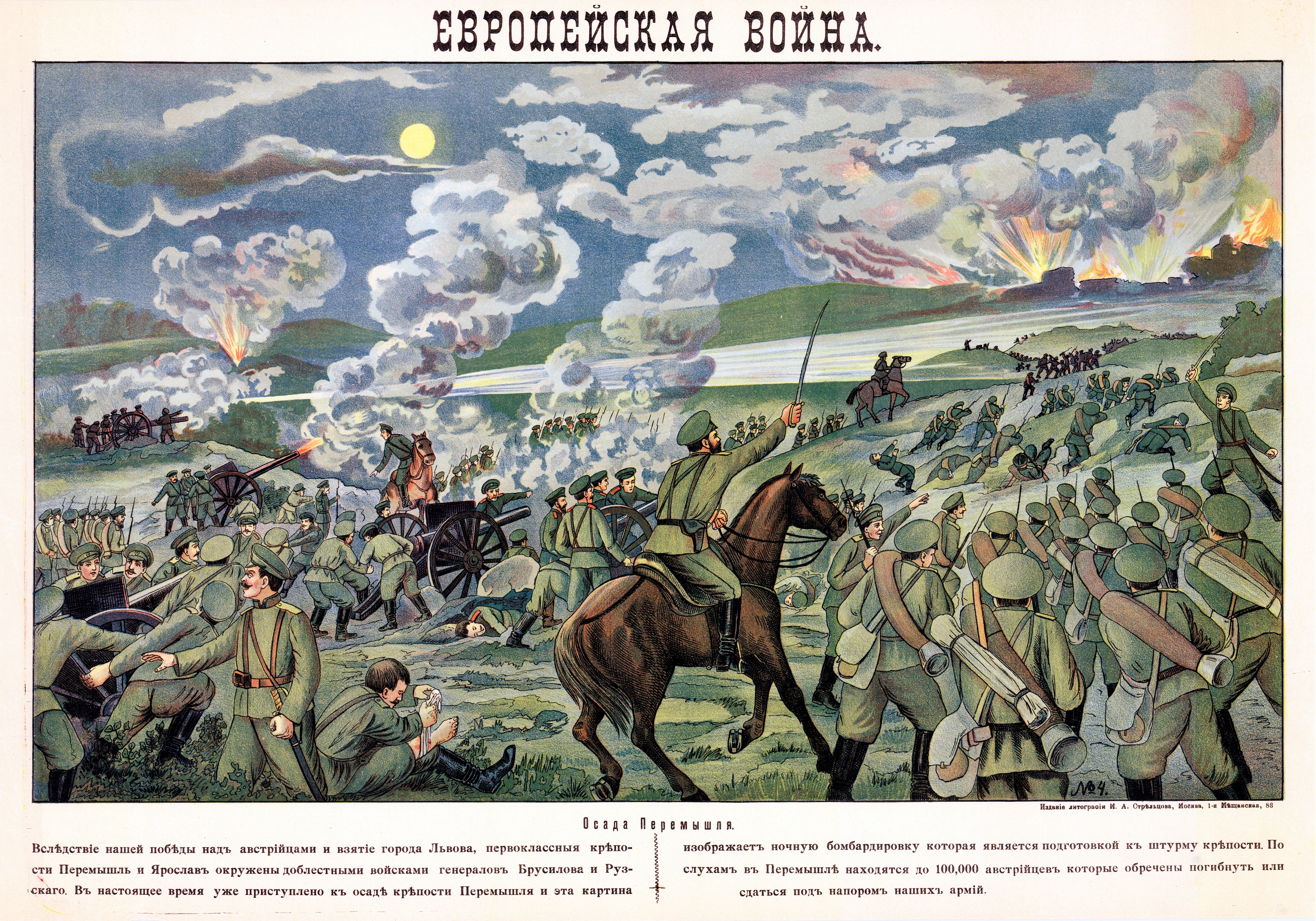
Siege of Przemyśl, Russian war poster 1915

By the end of October, the German and Austro-Hungarian armies were retreating west after their reversals in the Battle of the Vistula River. On 4 November, civilians were ordered to leave Przemyśl. On 10 November, the second siege started. The Russian 11th Army (General Andrei Nikolaevich Selivanov) took up the siege operations. Unlike Dimitriev, Selivanov did not order any frontal assaults, and instead settled to starve the garrison into submission. By mid-December, the Russians were pounding the fortress with ceaseless artillery fire, seeking to compel the town's surrender. During the winter 1914–1915 the Habsburg armies continued to fight their way to the fortress. Months of fighting resulted in great losses, largely from frostbite and disease but relieving forces failed to reach the garrison at Przemyśl.

In February 1915, Boroevic led another relief effort towards Przemyśl. By the end of February, all relief efforts having been defeated, Hötzendorf informed Hermann Kusmanek von Burgneustädten that no further efforts would be made. Selivanov was given sufficient artillery to reduce the fortress. The Russians overran the northern defenses on 13 March. An improvised line of defense held up the Russian attacks long enough for Kusmanek to destroy anything left in the city that could be of use to the Russians once captured. On 19 March Kusmanek ordered an attempt to break out but his sallies were repulsed and he was forced to retreat back into the city. With nothing useful left within the city, Kusmanek had no choice but to surrender. On 22 March, the remaining garrison of 117,000 surrendered to the Russians. Among the captured were nine generals, ninety-three senior staff officers, 2,500 other officers, and the Hungarian war poet Geza Gyoni.

== Life in Przemyśl under siege ==
Diaries and notebooks kept by various people in the town have survived. The diary of Josef Tomann, an Austrian recruited into military service as a junior doctor, reveals the extent of solicitation of prostitution among garrison officers in January 1915: "The hospitals have been recruiting teenage girls as nurses. They get 120 crowns a month and free meals ... Their main job is to satisfy the lust of the gentlemen officers and, rather shamefully, of a number of doctors, too … New officers are coming in almost daily with cases of syphilis, gonorrhea and soft chancre ... The poor girls feel so flattered when they get chatted up by these pestilent pigs..." Additionally, he records the starvation amongst the town's population: "Starvation is kicking in. Sunken, pale figures wander like corpses through the streets, their stony faces a picture of utter despair."

The diary of Helena Jabłońska, a Polish landlady renting her rooms to Przemyśl's garrison officers, shows the pervasive starvation and antisemitism in the city in October 1914; "The soldiers are out on the streets begging .... Municipal authorities try to regulate the prices but then all the goods vanish." and in March 1915: "The Jews are taking their shop signs down in a hurry, so that no one can tell who owns what. … They've all got so rich off the backs of those poor soldiers, and now of course they all want to run away!"

When the Imperial Russian Army finally took the city in March, the Tsarist soldiers unleashed a violent pogrom against the Jewish population of the city. Jabłońska noted: "The Cossacks waited until the Jews set off to the synagogue for their prayers before setting upon them with whips. They were deaf to any plea for mercy, regardless of age ... Some of the older, weaker ones who couldn't keep up were whipped. ... They say the round-up is going to continue until they've caught all of them. There is such lamenting and despair. Some Jews are hiding in cellars, but they'll get to them there too."

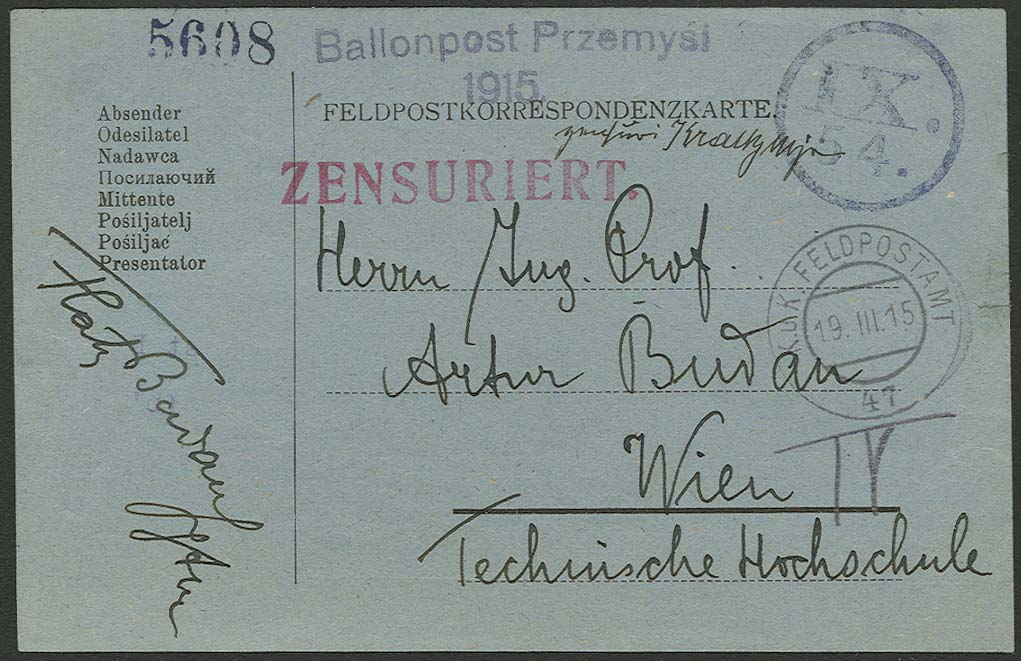
Censored balloon mail from Przemyśl to Vienna

== Mail communications ==
Airmail flights from Przemyśl during both sieges when airmail postcards, mostly military mail, were flown from the besieged city on twenty-seven flights. Following a forced landing, mail from one flight was confiscated by the Russians and sent to Saint Petersburg for postal censorship and onward transmission. Balloon mail, on some manned but mainly unmanned paper balloons, was also carried out of the city. Pigeon mail was also used to send messages out of the city.

== Results ==
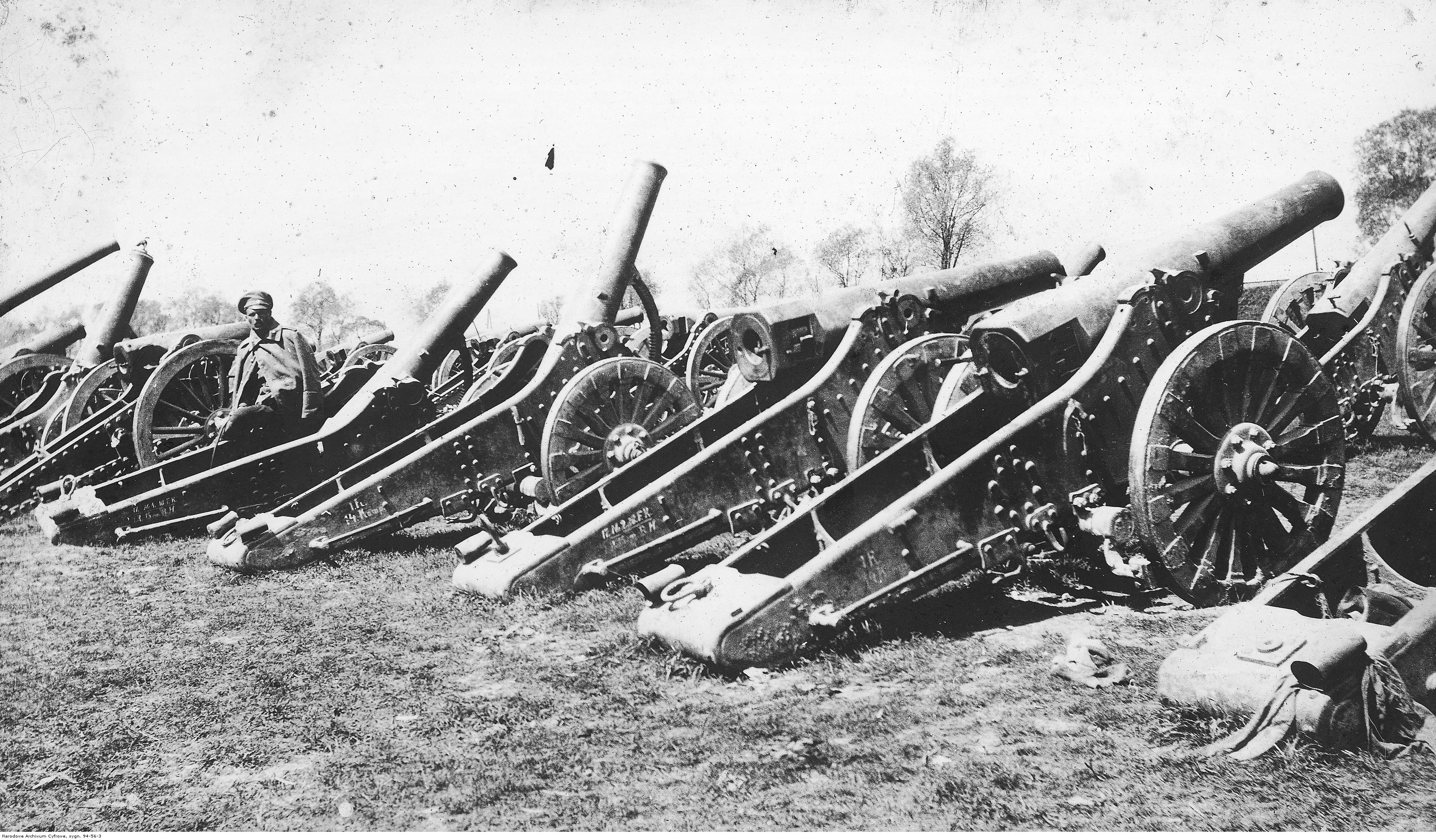
Captured Austro-Hungarian cannons after the siege

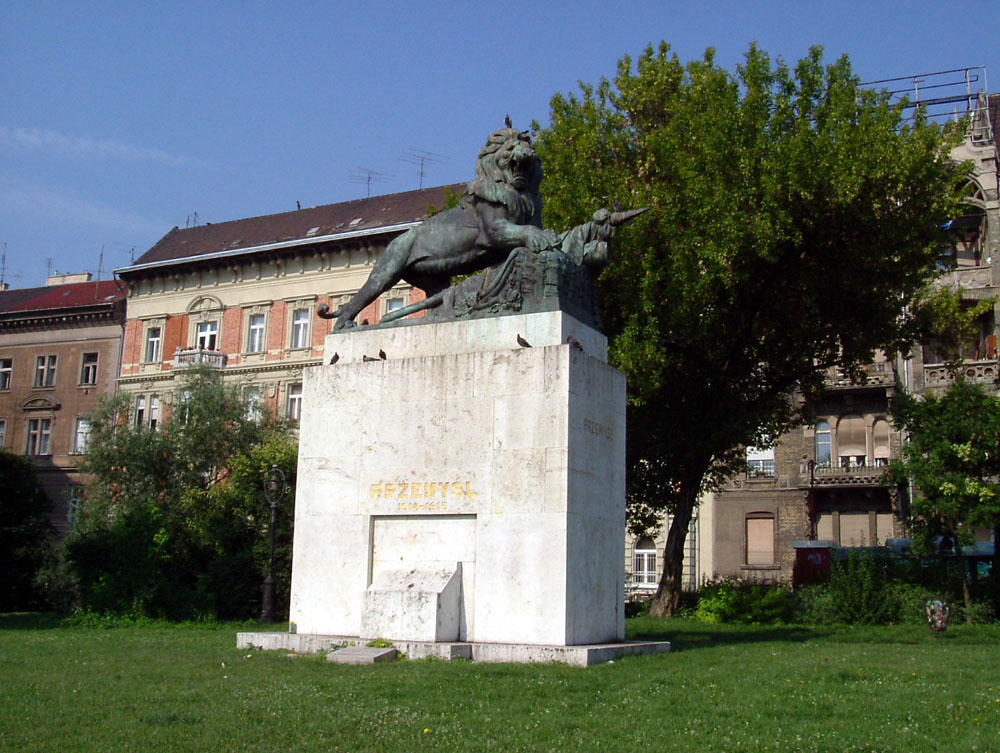
Statue commemorating the siege of Przemyśl in Budapest, Hungary

Austro-Hungarian attempts to relieve the fortress ended catastrophically as the poorly supplied and outnumbered imperial forces attempted offensive after offensive through the Carpathian Mountains. Casualties for January to April 1915, in the Carpathians, were officially reported as 800,000, mostly due to weather and disease rather than combat. Russian casualties were nearly as high, but easier to replace, and balanced out more by the surrender of 117,000 Austro-Hungarian troops at the end of the siege. All told, the siege and the attempts to relieve it cost the Austro-Hungarian army over a million casualties and inflicted on it significant damage from which it would never recover.

On 9 March 1915, Russian troops captured 9 Austrian generals in the Przemyśl fortress: Infantry General Hermann Kusmanek von Burgneustädten Field Marshal-Lieutenants Karl Weizendorfer, Arpad Tamasha von Fogaras, Wilhelm Nickl and Major Generals Rudolf Zeide, Alfred Weber, George Komm, Arthur Kaltnecker and Friedrich Kloiber. The commandant of the fortress, G. Kusmanek, became the highest-ranking general of the German bloc among those who were captured by the Russians.

The fall of Przemyśl led many to believe that Russia would now launch a major offensive into Hungary. This anticipated offensive never came, but the loss of Przemyśl was a serious blow to Austro-Hungarian morale. A further blow to Austria-Hungary was the fact that Przemyśl was only supposed to be garrisoned by 50,000, yet over 110,000 Austro-Hungarians surrendered with the fortress, a much more significant loss. The Russians held Przemyśl until the summer of 1915 when the Gorlice–Tarnów offensive pushed back the Russian front in Galicia.

Przemyśl stayed in Austro-Hungarian hands until October 1918, at which point Eastern Galicia left the Austro-Hungarian Empire and became part of the newly created independent state of Poland. The Austro-Hungarian army never recovered from its losses in the winter of 1914–1915 and the Habsburgs would rely henceforth on German assistance both in their sector of the Eastern Front and in the Balkans.

== Sources ==
- Tunstall, Graydon A. (2016). Written in Blood: The Battles for Fortress Przemysl in WWI. Indiana University Press. ISBN 9780253021977.
- Watson, Alexander (2019). The Fortress: The Great Siege of Przemysl. London: Allen Lane. ISBN 9780241309063. online review in H-DIPLO
- Watson, Alexander (2020). The Fortress: The Siege of Przemysl and the Making of Europe's Bloodlands. Basic Books. ISBN 978-1-5416-9732-4.
