= Lubenia =

- Village
- Location within Poland
- Coordinates: 49°55′59″N 21°55′17″E
- Country: Poland
- Voivodeship: Subcarpathian
- County: Rzeszów
- Gmina: Lubenia
- Elevation: 300 m (980 ft)
- Population: 2,400
- Website: http://www.lubenia.pl/

Lubenia [luˈbɛɲa] is a village in Rzeszów County, Subcarpathian Voivodeship, in south-eastern Poland. It is the seat of the gmina (administrative district) called Gmina Lubenia.
