= Hermann Kusmanek von Burgneustädten =

Austrian general (1860–1934)

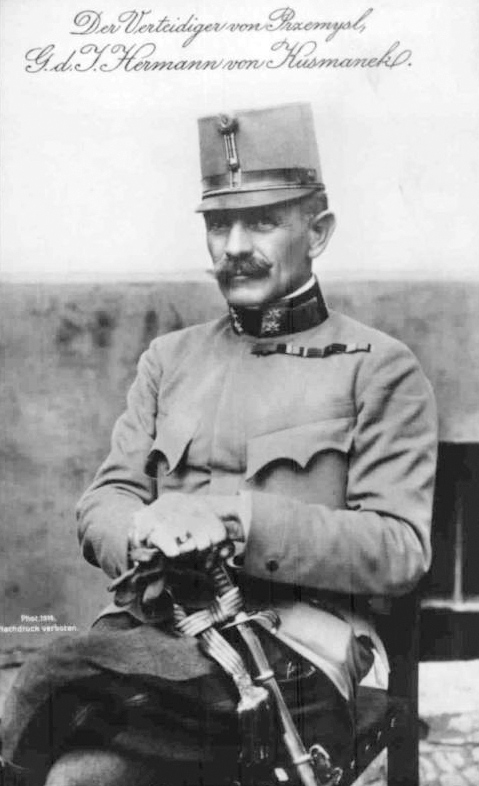
- Born: 16 September 1860; Hermannstadt
- Died: 7 August 1934 (aged 73); Vienna
- Burial place: Vienna Central Cemetery
- Military career
- Allegiance: Austria-Hungary
- Branch: (Austria-Hungary) Austro-Hungarian Army
- Rank: Colonel General
- Conflicts: World War I; Siege of Przemyśl

Hermann Kusmanek von Burgneustädten (16 September 1860 – 7 August 1934) was a colonel general of the Austrian Imperial Army. He gained particular fame during World War I by his defence from September 1914 to March 1915 of the fortress of Przemyśl against a Russian siege.

== Biography ==
Born in Hermannstadt, he was the son of the senior policeman Josef Kusmanek and his wife Juliana (née Wiehner). Kusmanek attended a military secondary school in Hranice, then Military Academy in Wiener Neustadt and finally the War College from 1882 to 1884. As a lieutenant, he was appointed to the General Staff and served in Budapest, Foča, and Ljubljana. In 1888, as a General Staff Captain he was appointed to the staff of the III Corps in Graz; then from 1889 to 1893 he worked directly for the Ministry of War in Vienna. He was then transferred to regimental service and served for two years as a company commander in the Bohemian infantry regiment in Eger. In 1894 he was promoted to Major and he took a two-year service to the description of the country office of the General Staff in Vienna and in the military history department of the war archive. In 1895, he was promoted to lieutenant colonel and returned to regimental service in the 63rd Infantry Regiment in Bistrita and in 1899 returned to the War Department, where he served as Chief of the Presidential Office in March 1903. As early as 1903, he was the colonel and then promoted in 1906 to Major General. In October 1908 he became commander of the 65th Infantry Brigade in Raab and in April 1910 became Division commander in Innsbruck. On 1 November 1910, he was appointed Lieutenant General, and in January 1911 the commander of the 28th Infantry Division troops in Ljubljana. Kusmanek was ennobled by Emperor Franz Joseph I on October 3, 1913 and, in memory of his former training center, the Theresian Military Academy in the castle in Wiener Neustadt, chose the predicate "Von (from) Burgneustädten". As his coat of arms he adopted one of the two towers of the coat of arms of Wiener Neustadt.

At the beginning of the First World War he was appointed Commander of the Przemyśl Fortress. The Austro-Hungarian army had to retreat west after the summer campaign of 1914, but held on the Przemyśl fortress, that was besieged by Russian troops. The fortress was already outdated; of the 38 belt works of the defensive ring only 12 had been modernized and provided with reinforced ceilings. Of the 988 existing fortress guns, only 28 corresponded to the state of the art at the time. Kusmanek also complained that the intervals between the forts were too wide and pointed out the insufficient fortifications in the 8th Defense District.

A first siege of Przemyśl from September 16 to October 9, 1914 was repelled after successful relief by Austrian troops. On November 1, 1914, before the start of the second siege, Kusmanek had been promoted to general of the infantry. The second siege, which lasted from November 5 to March 22, 1915, was successful for the attackers. After the fall of the northern defence line and a last, failed, very costly attempt to break out on March 19, the general decided to hand over the fortress to the Russian besieging army. Kusmanek asked the emperor for permission to hand over the fortress with honor, which the monarch granted. Kusmanek, wearing his Imperial Russian Order of St. Anne on his chest, went into Russian captivity for almost three years together with 2,500 officers and 117,000 non-commissioned officers and soldiers. During the captivity he lived in Nizhny Novgorod, later he occupied four rooms in the Governor General's building in Kiev. Upon the Eastern front armistice of 1918, he returned to Vienna and was received by Emperor Charles who decorated him with the Order of the Iron Crown 1st Class and appointed Colonel General on March 1, 1918 (with the rank of May 15, 1917).

== Orders, Decorations and Medals (Selected) ==
- Military Order of Maria Theresa, Knight, March 10 1921
- Order of Leopold (Austria), Grand Cross, March 16 1918
- Order of the Iron Crown (Austria), Ist Class, February 18 1928
- Marian Cross (Teutonic Order), before 1912

== Sources ==
- Rainer Egger (1982). "Kusmanek von Burgneustädten, Hermann". Neue Deutsche Biographie (in German). Vol. 13. Berlin: Duncker & Humblot. pp. 340–341. (full text online). (in German)
- O. von Hofmann, G. von Hubka: Der Mil.-Maria Theresien-Orden, Die Auszeichnungen im Weltkrieg 1914–18. 1944, pp. 175–180
- Kiszling: "Kusmanek von Burgneustädten, Hermann". In: Österreichisches Biographisches Lexikon 1815–1950 (ÖBL). Vol. 4, Austrian Academy of Sciences, Vienna 1969, p. 372. (in German)
- J. Svoboda: Die Theresian. Mil.-Ak. zu Wiener-Neustadt. Band II, 1894, pp. 714 f. and Vol. III, 1897, p. 84 (in German)
- Österreich-Ungarns letzter Krieg 1914–18, 2 vols., 1930 f. (in German)
