= Józef Kowalski (priest) =

Polish Roman Catholic priest and martyr

Blessed Józef Kowalski
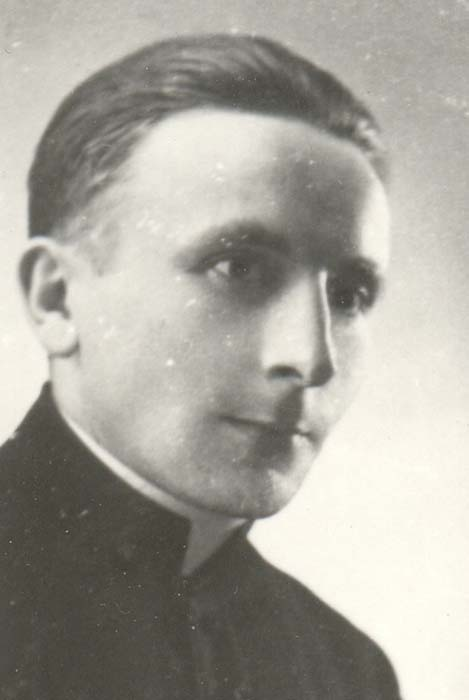
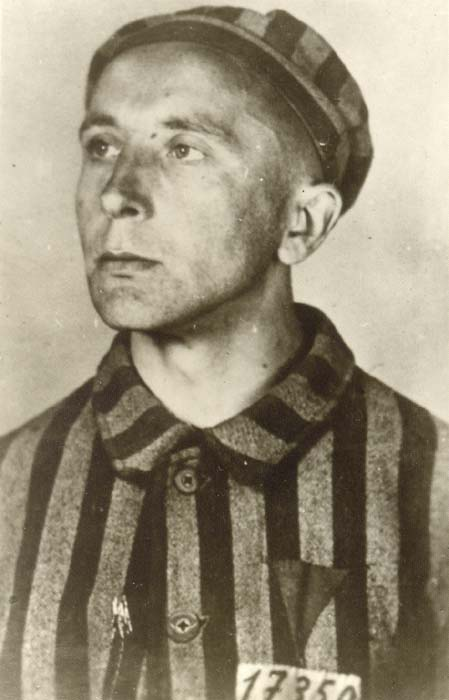
- Salesian priest Józef Kowalski Kowalski, the prisoner No. 17350 in Auschwitz concentration camp
- Born: 13 March 1911; Siedliska, Kingdom of Galicia and Lodomeria, Austria-Hungary
- Died: 4 July 1942 (aged 31); Auschwitz-Birkenau, German-occupied Poland
- Beatified: 13 June 1999, Warsaw, Poland by Pope John Paul II
- Feast: 4 July

Józef Kowalski (13 March 1911 – 4 July 1942) was a Polish Roman Catholic priest from the Salesian Society murdered at the Auschwitz concentration camp during World War II. He was beatified in Warsaw on 13 June 1999.

== Biography ==
Józef Kowalski was born in Siedliska (partitioned Poland) on 13 March 1911 to Wojciech and Zofia Borowiec, the seventh of their nine children. He was ordained a priest on 29 May 1938 in Kraków as member of the Salesian Religious Society, and took up a post of secretary to the Salesian provincial. During the German occupation of Poland the Salesians continued their educational work. The Gestapo arrested Kowalski on 23 May 1941, along with eleven other Salesians who worked in Kraków. They were taken to Montelupich Prison and tortured.

=== Auschwitz concentration camp ===
Kowalski was sent to Auschwitz concentration camp on 26 June 1941 (prisoner number 17,350 or 17,950). There, he ministered secretly to his fellow prisoners in Block 25, and attempted to strengthen their will to survive day-to-day life in the camp. He absolved condemned victims, usually in secret, but at least once in front of everyone at the moment of mass execution. He was known at Auschwitz simply as Father Józef. At one roll call, he was ordered by Blockführer Gerhard Palitzsch to trample upon his rosary when he was discovered with it. Kowalski refused. As punishment, he was assigned to a penal company. In his last letter to his parents, Józef wrote:

Do not worry about me; I am in God's hands. I want to assure you that I feel His help at every step. Despite the present situation, I am happy and completely at peace.

On 3 July 1942 he was mocked, ridiculed and severely beaten by the guards for being a priest. The same night, his oppressors pulled him out of his barracks, gravely beat him outside and possibly drowned him. Kowalski's body was found the next day and burned with others. He was 31 years of age.

Poles began to venerate his memory after World War II. Pope John Paul II had known Father Kowalski personally before the war, when Kowalski lived and served with the Parish of St. Stanisław Kostka in Dębniki, Kraków. During one of his return visits to Poland, John Paul II beatified Kowalski in Warsaw at a ceremonial three-hour mass of 13 June 1999, attended by President Aleksander Kwaśniewski, in front of 600,000 people. Kowalski was one of 108 Polish Martyrs from World War II beatified by the Pope on that day.
