= Gmina Lubenia =

Gmina Lubenia Lubenia Commune
- Gmina
- Interactive map of Gmina Lubenia
- Coordinates (Lubenia): 49°55′59″N 21°55′17″E
- Country: Poland
- Voivodeship: Subcarpathian
- County: Rzeszów County
- Seat: Lubenia

Area
  - Total: 54.77 km^{2} (21.15 sq mi)

Population (2017)
  - Total: 6,438
  - Density: 117.5/km^{2} (304.4/sq mi)
- Website: http://www.lubenia.pl

Gmina Lubenia is a rural gmina (administrative district) in Rzeszów County, Subcarpathian Voivodeship, in south-eastern Poland. Its seat is the village of Lubenia, which lies approximately 13 kilometres (8 mi) south-west of the regional capital Rzeszów.

The gmina covers an area of 54.77 square kilometres (21.1 sq mi), and as of 2006 its total population is 6,438.

== Villages ==
Gmina Lubenia contains the villages and settlements of Lubenia, Siedliska, Sołonka and Straszydle.

== Neighbouring gminas ==
Gmina Lubenia is bordered by the gminas of Błażowa, Boguchwała, Czudec, Niebylec and Tyczyn.
