= Solonka, Volgograd Oblast =

Village in Volgograd Oblast, Russia

Solonka Солонка
- Selo
- Location within Volgograd Oblast Location within Russia
- Coordinates: 50°11′N 41°27′E
- Country: Russia
- Region: Volgograd Oblast
- District: Nekhayevsky District
- Time zone: UTC+4:00

Solonka (Russian: Солонка) is a rural locality (a selo) and the administrative center of Solonskoye Rural Settlement, Nekhayevsky District, Volgograd Oblast, Russia. The population was 1,064 as of 2010. There are 17 streets.

== Geography ==
Solonka is located on Kalach Upland, 46 km southwest of Nekhayevskaya (the district's administrative centre) by road. Kamensky is the nearest rural locality.
