= Przemyśl Fortress =

Complex of defensive facilities around Przemyśl, Poland

Coordinates: 49°47′10″N 22°46′26″E

Przemyśl fortress
- Przemyśl, Poland
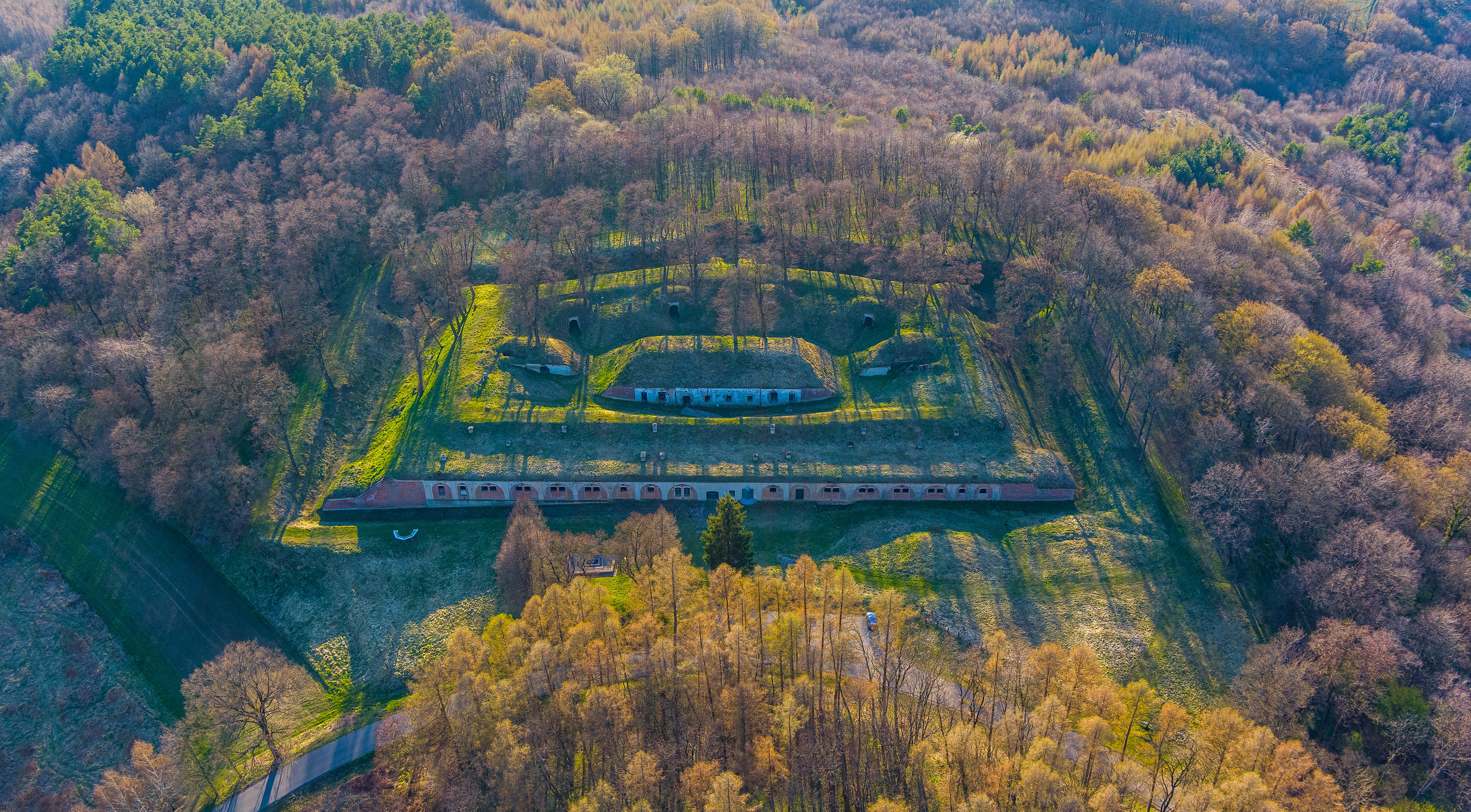
- Fort VIII "Łętownia"

Site information
- Type: Fortification
- Condition: Abandoned

Site history
- Built: 1854
- Built by: Austro-Hungarian Empire
- Battles/wars: Siege of Przemyśl

Garrison information
- Current commander: None
- Past commanders: Hermann Kusmanek von Burgneustädten
- Garrison: >120,000

Historic Monument of Poland
- Designated: 2018-12-10
- Reference no.: Dz. U. z 2018 r. poz. 988

Przemyśl fortress (Polish: Twierdza Przemyśl) is a series of fortifications around Przemyśl, Poland. It was constructed by the Austro-Hungarian Empire from the mid 19th century until the First World War in sections, depending on the diplomatic relations between Austria and the Russian Empire, and saw extensive combat during World War I. Originally captured by the Russian Army, it was recaptured by the German Army in mid-1915. Afterwards the ruined fortifications lost their military significance.

== History ==
=== Construction ===
Fortress layout

The initial construction plans for 41 entrenchments were drawn up at the beginning of the 19th century; however, good relations between Austria and the Russian Empire, meant that construction did not go ahead until 1854, with the outbreak of the Crimean War. Nineteen of the 41 entrenchments were completed, with nine more under construction when relations again improved in 1855, and construction was halted. Until 1878, no work was undertaken on the fortress.

In 1878, the barracks, magazines and inter-connecting roads were completed, as well as nine earth forts in light of the Bosnian Crisis. Three years later, in 1881, these temporary earth works were converted into permanent solid fortifications, and by 1910, infantry fortifications had been added. When war broke out in 1914, the fortress was further reinforced with trenches, more barracks and artillery emplacements. After the war, with much of its defences destroyed, the fortress fell into disrepair, and no longer had any military significance. The area was fortified again in 1940, with modern bunkers built as part of the Soviet Molotov Line, but these new fortifications had little to do with the original Austro-Hungarian fortress.

=== World War I ===
According to Prit Buttar, "...the huge fortress of Przemyśl...had been heavily fortified by the Austro-Hungarian Empire in order to protect the approaches to the Carpathian passes. It was also substantially provisioned, so that a garrison could survive a prolonged siege if necessary. In addition to the central fortress, twenty-five smaller forts and twelve major artillery emplacements surrounded Przemyśl. Provided that it was garrisoned adequately, the Austro-Hungarians believed, it would constitute a formidable obstacle to any Russian advance."

On the outbreak of World War I, the fortress was only garrisoned by a small force of five infantry battalions, artillery and sappers. Defence preparations began on August 2, 1914, the civilians were evacuated on September 4, and the Austro-Hungarian Army's HQ followed on September 15. Two days later, on September 17, 1914 the Russian army laid siege to the fortress, sealing it off totally by September 26.

The siege continued into October, with a truce being offered and subsequently refused on October 5. Bombardment intensified in the next few days, and on October 7 the Russians assaulted the fortress at 3.00am. The Russians lost 10,000 personnel, 3—4,000 of them killed, and by October 9 a relief force had pushed them back to the San river. The fortress was later abandoned by all but a small defensive force on November 4 as it was in danger of being outflanked. The remaining troops were left to tie down the Russian forces for as long as possible, and when they were surrounded for a second time they sortied continuously through late November and December.

Food shortages through the spring of 1915 led to the butchering of 13,000 horses to feed the garrison, and by March 14, 1915 the outer fortification had been captured or destroyed by the Russian army. At this point, in the face of low food and morale, the fortress commander, General Hermann Kusmanek von Burgneustädten decided to break out. His forces, however, were bogged down and repulsed by the Russians. Documents were burned on March 19 and the artillery was destroyed on March 22, and later that same day 119,000 troops surrendered to the Russian forces.

Tsar Nicholas II visited the fortress on April 25, 1915 as the Russians adapted it for their purposes. By May 16, however, German forces had reached the fortress, and after laying siege, they captured in on June 5, 1915, led by General von Kneussl. Afterwards slight repairs were made, however the mostly ruined fortifications no longer had serious military significance. They may have been used briefly during the fighting in the course of the Polish-Ukrainian War in the 1920s and very briefly during the Second World War.

== Gallery ==
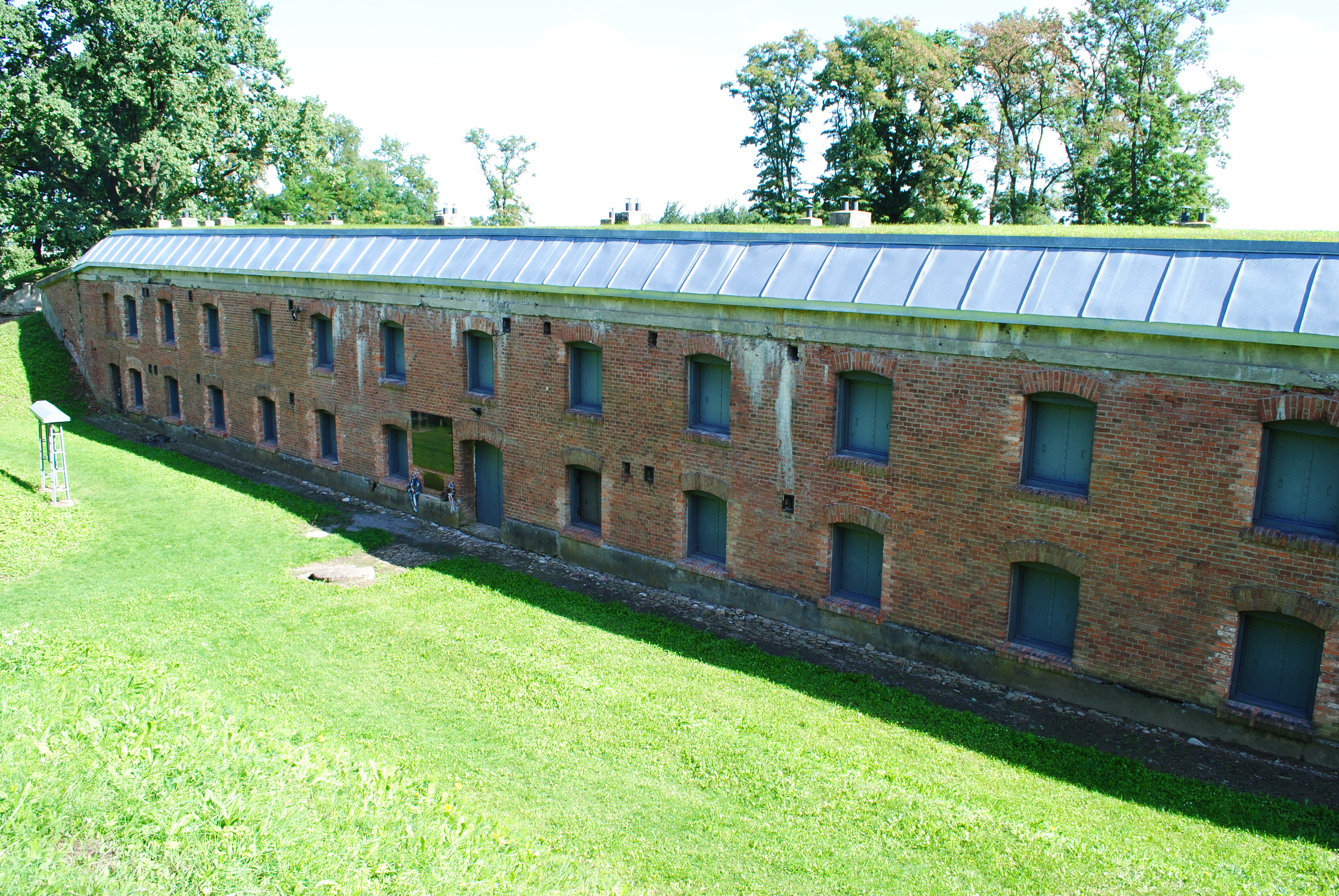
Fort XV "Borek"

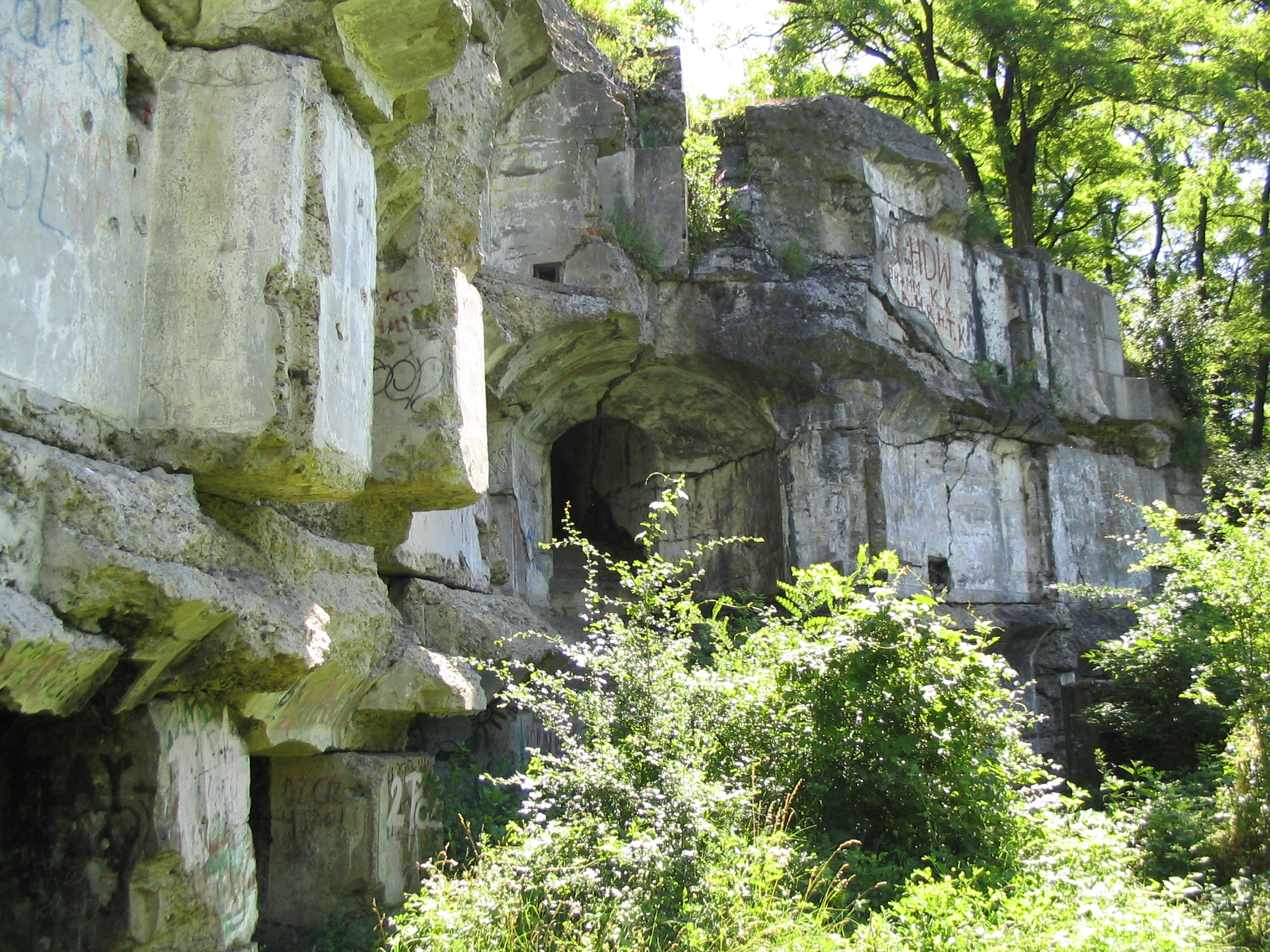
Fortification walls

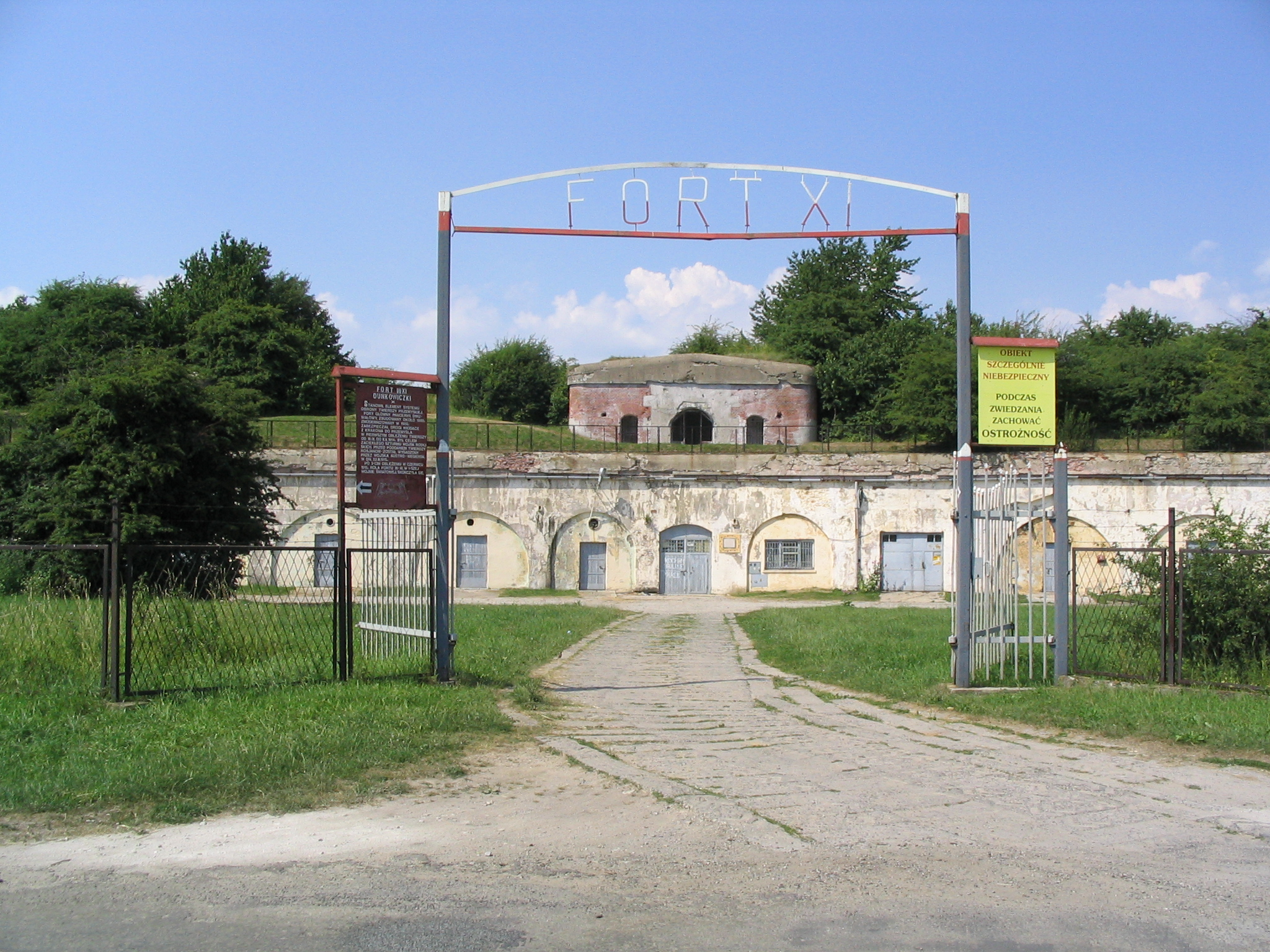
The entrance to one of the outer fortifications

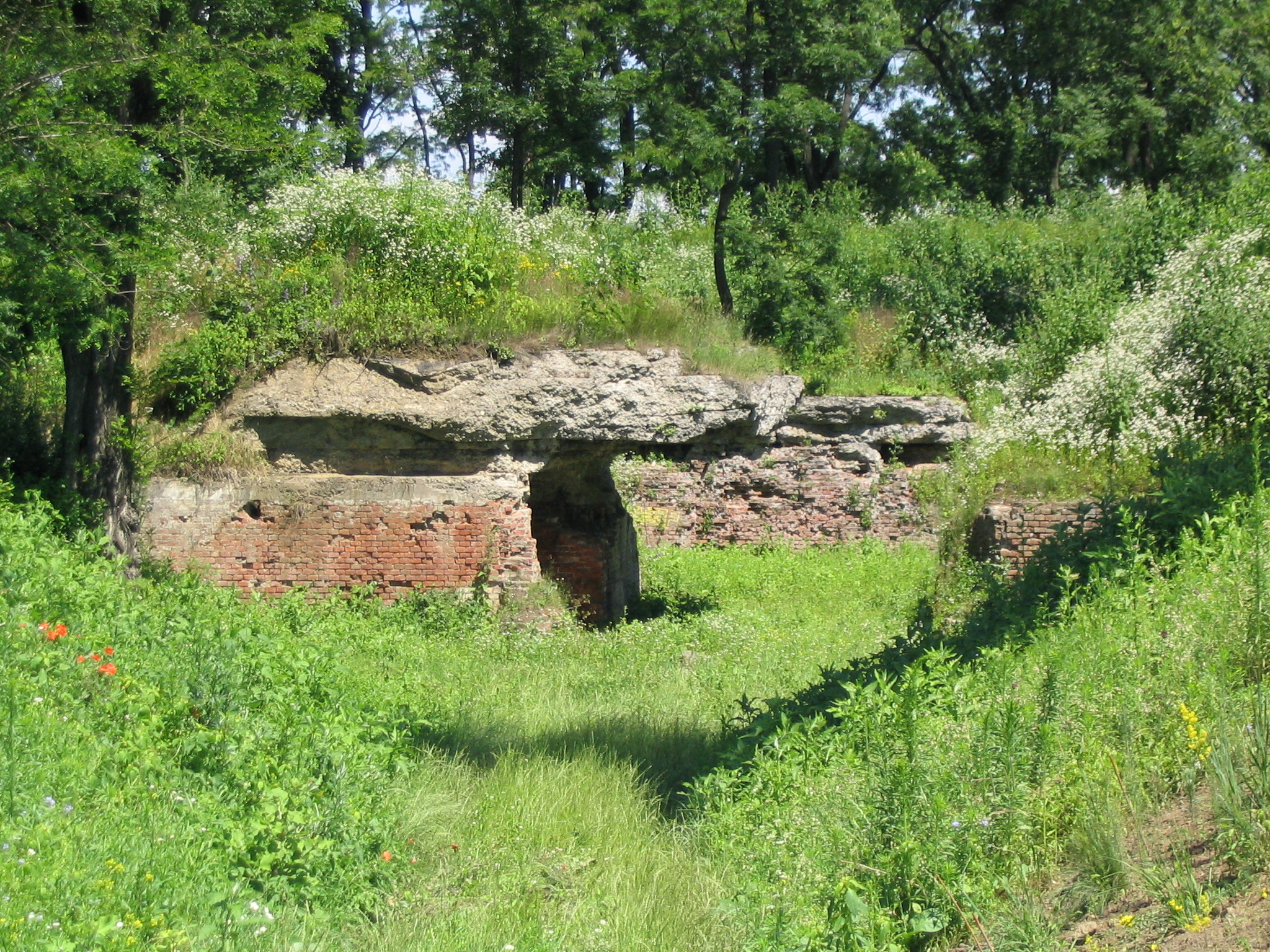
An outer bunker fort

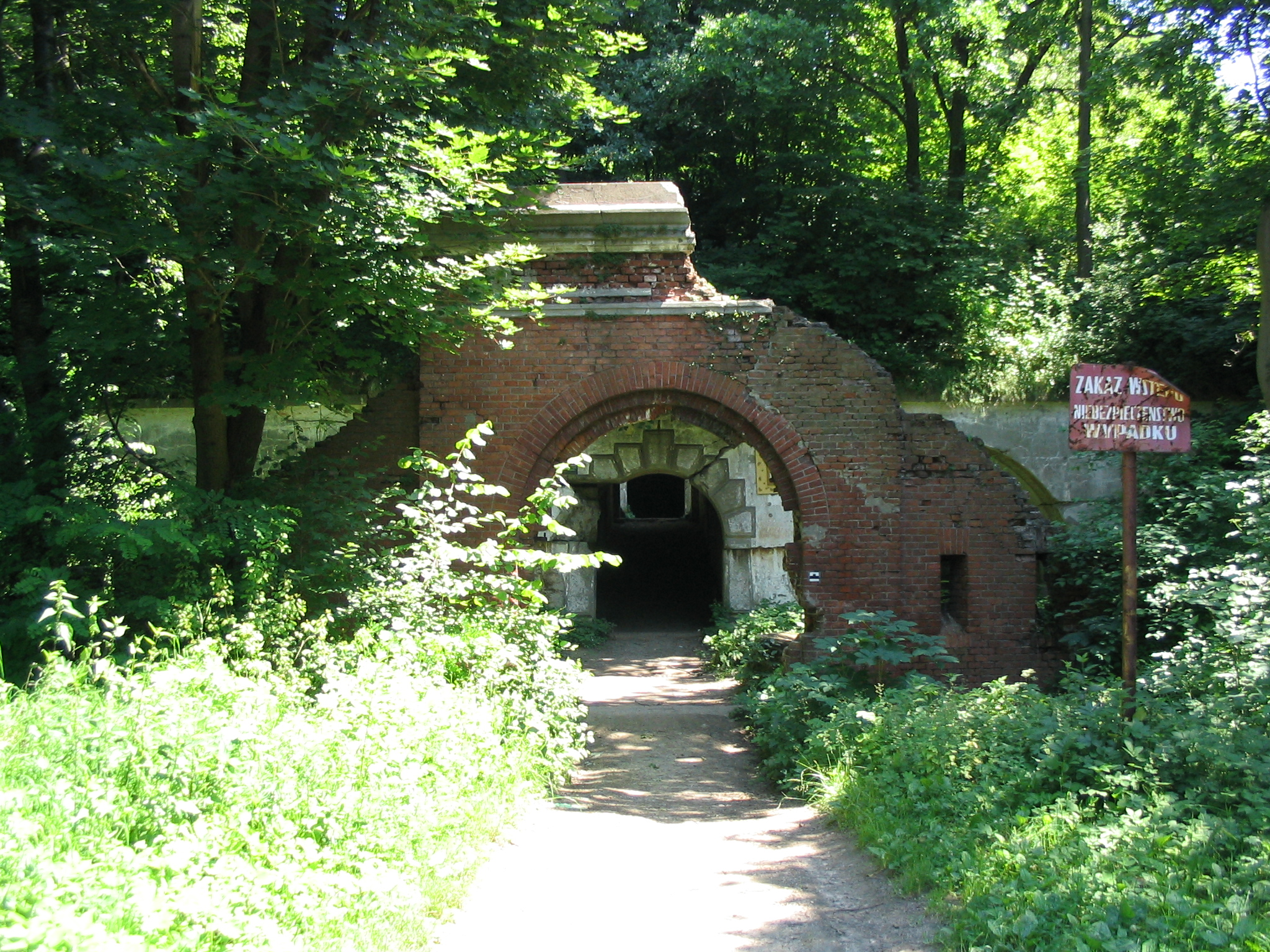
An outer fort entrance

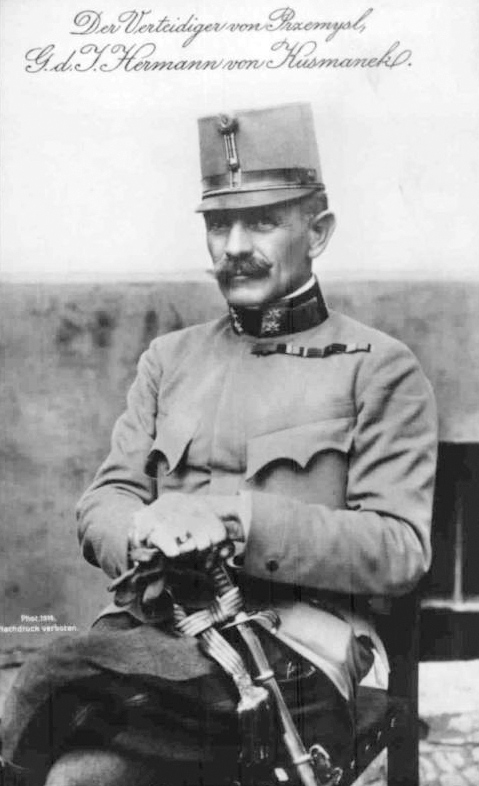
Herman Kusmanek, the Austrian commander of the fort
