= Sołonka =

Village in Subcarpathian Voivodeship, Poland

- Village
- Location within Poland
- Coordinates: 49°55′N 21°58′E
- Country: Poland
- Voivodeship: Subcarpathian
- County: Rzeszów
- Gmina: Lubenia
- Population: 478

Sołonka [sɔˈwɔŋka] is a village in the administrative district of Gmina Lubenia, within Rzeszów County, Subcarpathian Voivodeship, in south-eastern Poland.

== Tourist attractions ==
Remains of a salt mine were discovered in Sołonka which was believed to be used during the pre-Slavonic times and was very likely used in the Middle Ages. In the Middle Ages, there was a trade route from Hungary towards Sandomierz, this route was called the royal route. In the Roman period, amber routes led to Sołonka in the 4th-5th century CE. In 2009-2010 a salt cascade was built.

== Gallery ==
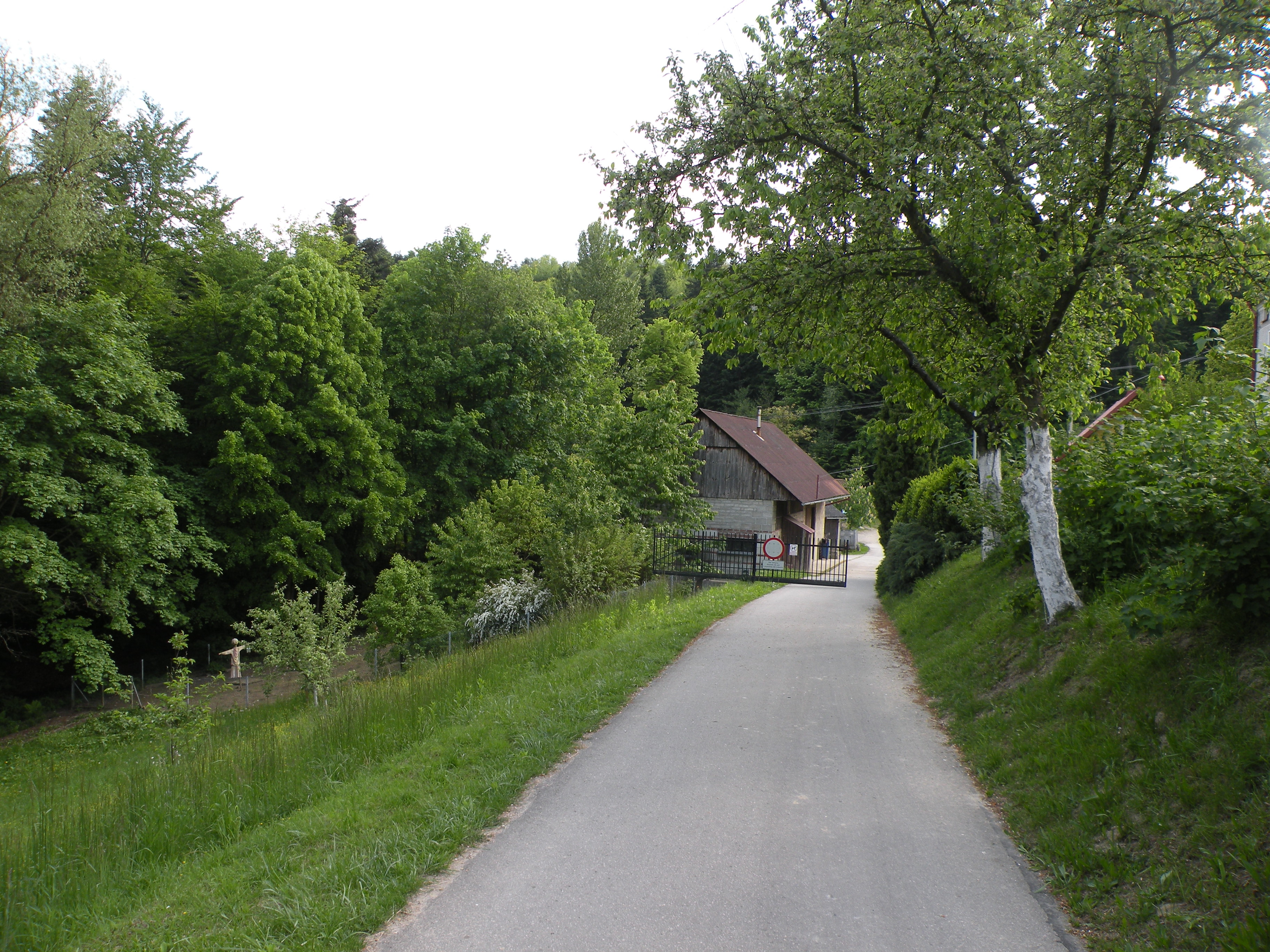
Road to the salt cascade

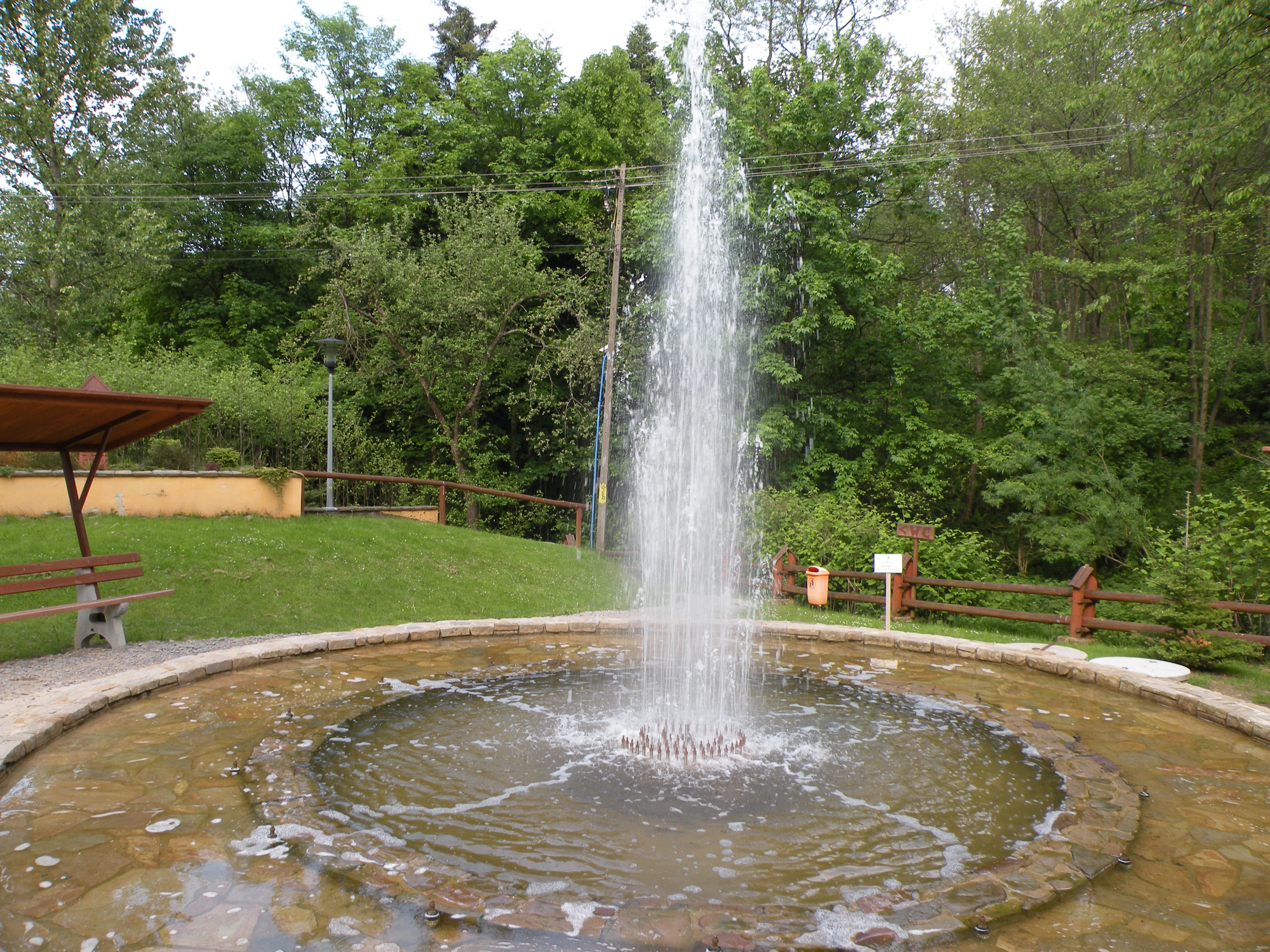
Water fountain near the salt cascade

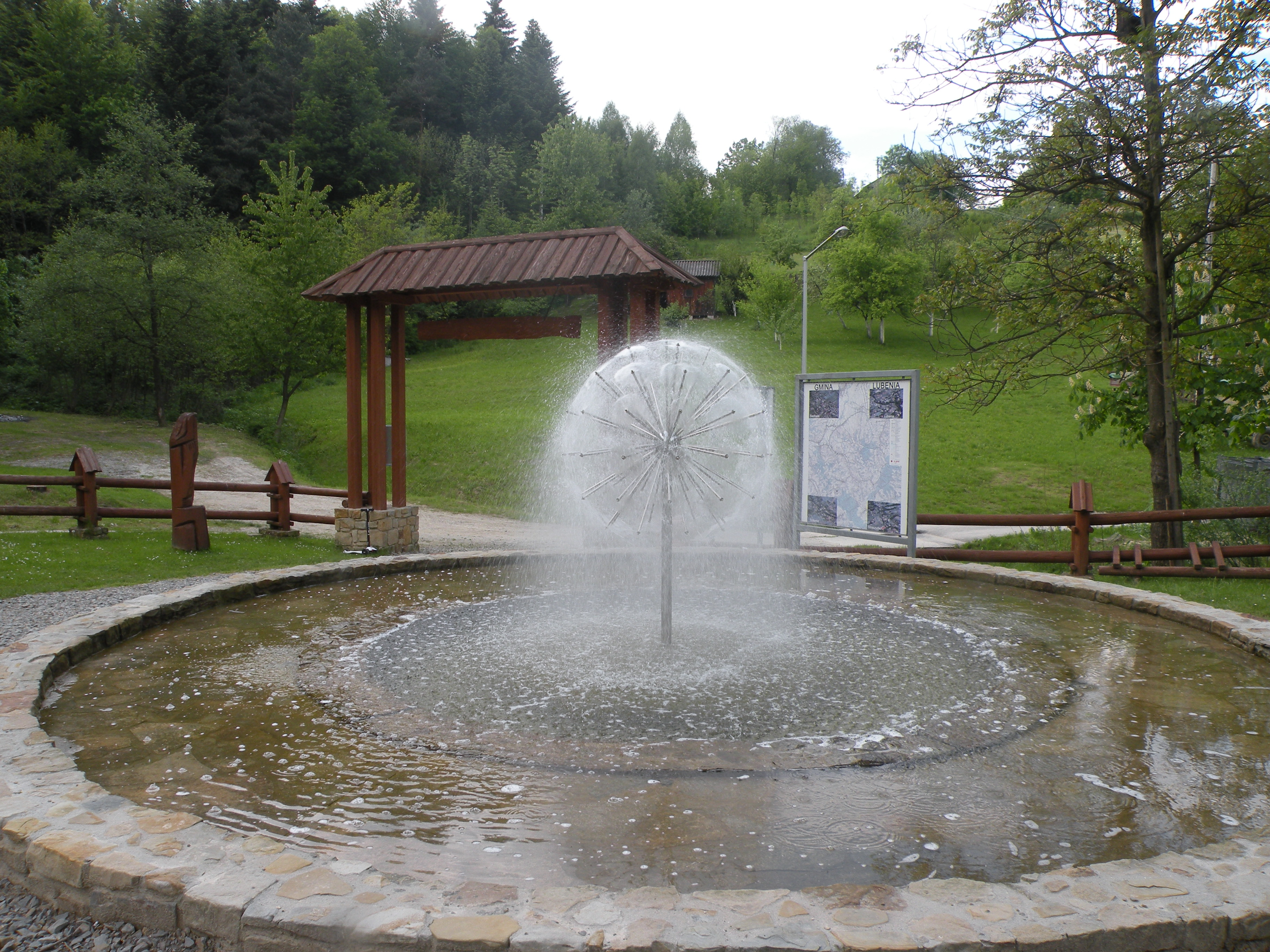
Water fountain near the salt cascade

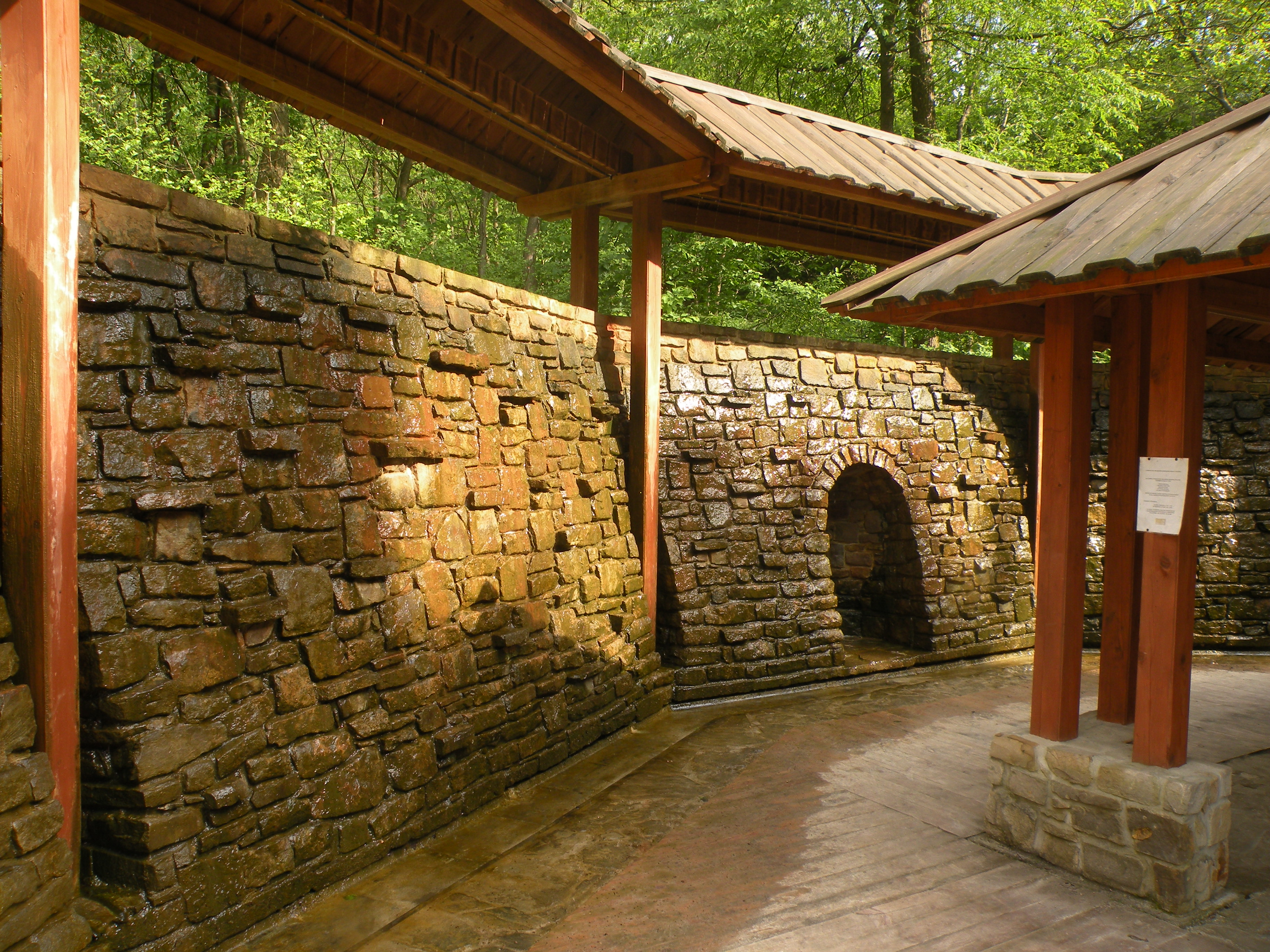
Salt cascade

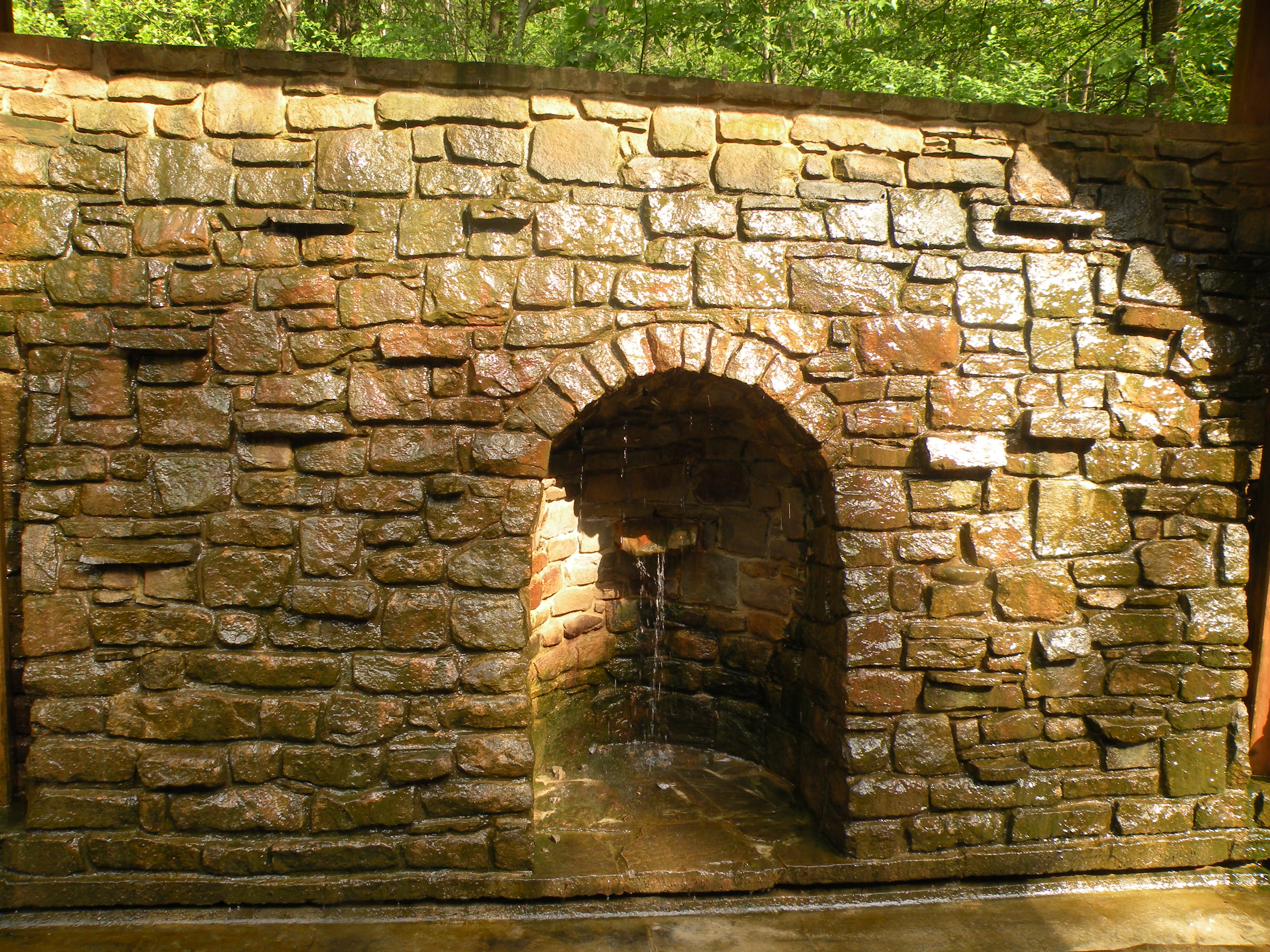
Salt cascade

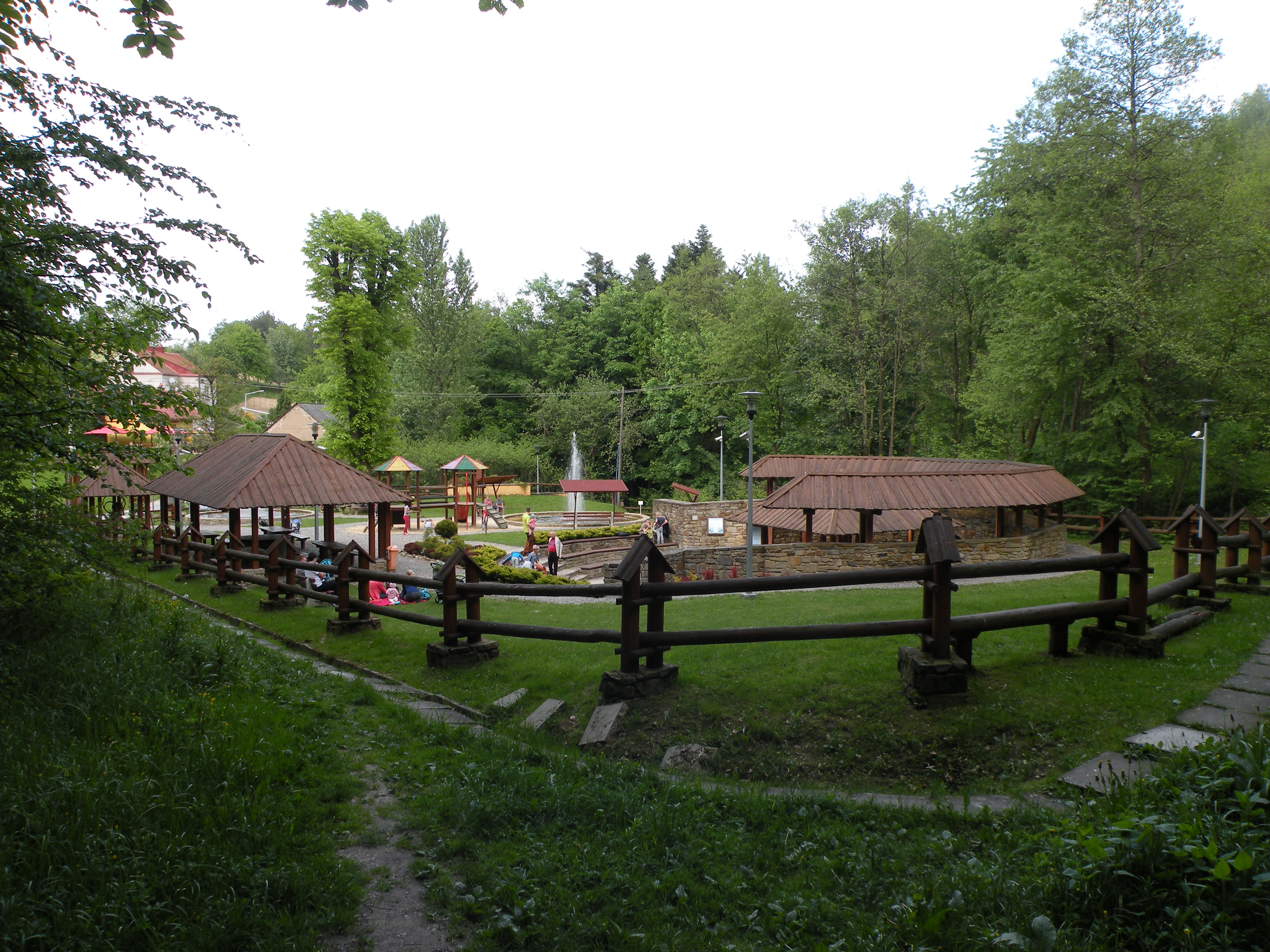
Surroundings of the salt cascade
